Below is a list of various national team ice hockey team rosters of Canada. The men's team, women's team and the junior team are included.

Men's

2022 Men's World Ice Hockey Championship
Head coach:  Claude Julien
Assistant coach:  Nolan Baumgartner
Assistant coach:  D.J. Smith
Assistant coach:  Andre Tourigny

Goaltender
 Chris Driedger – Seattle Kraken
 Logan Thompson – Vegas Golden Knights
 Matt Tomkins – Frolunda HC

Defence
 Thomas Chabot (C) – Ottawa Senators
 Ryan Graves – New Jersey Devils
 Nick Holden – Ottawa Senators
 Dysin Mayo – Arizona Coyotes
 Travis Sanheim – Philadelphia Flyers
 Damon Severson (A) – New Jersey Devils
 Zach Whitecloud – Vegas Golden Knights

Forward
 Josh Anderson (A) – Montreal Canadiens
 Mathew Barzal – New York Islanders
 Drake Batherson – Ottawa Senators
 Maxime Comtois – Anaheim Ducks
 Dylan Cozens – Buffalo Sabers
 Pierre-Luc Dubois (A) – Winnipeg Jets
 Morgan Geekie – Seattle Kraken
 Noah Gregor – San Jose Sharks
 Kent Johnson – Columbus Blue Jackets
 Adam Lowry (A) – Winnipeg Jets
 Dawson Mercer – New Jersey Devils
 Eric O'Dell – Dynamo Moscow
 Nicolas Roy – Vegas Golden Knights
 Cole Sillinger – Columbus Blue Jackets

2022 Winter Olympics
Roster for the 2022 Winter Olympics. NHL players were not allowed to participate.

Head coach: Claude Julien

2021 Men's World Ice Hockey Championship
Head coach:  Gerard Gallant
Assistant coach:  Michael Dyck
Assistant coach:  Mike Kelly
Assistant coach:  Andre Tourigny

Goaltender
 Adin Hill – Arizona Coyotes
 Darcy Kuemper – Arizona Coyotes
 Michael DiPietro – Vancouver Canucks

Defence
 Braden Schneider – Brandon Wheat Kings
 Jacob Bernard-Docker – Ottawa Senators
 Colin Miller – Buffalo Sabers
 Owen Power – University of Michigan
 Sean Walker – Los Angeles Kings
 Mario Ferraro – San Jose Sharks
 Troy Stetcher – Detroit Red Wings
 Nicolas Beaudin – Chicago Blackhawks

Forward
 Liam Foudy – Columbus Blue Jackets
 Jaret Anderson-Dolan – Los Angeles Kings
 Gabriel Vilardi – Los Angeles Kings
 Adam Henrique (C) – Anaheim Ducks
 Justin Danforth – Columbus Blue Jackets
 Nick Paul – Ottawa Senators
 Brandon Hagel – Chicago Blackhawks
 Michael Bunting – Arizona Coyotes
 Connor Brown (A) – Ottawa Senators
 Maxime Comtois – Anaheim Ducks
 Brandon Pirri – Chicago Blackhawks
 Andrew Mangiapane – Calgary Flames
 Cole Perfetti – Saginaw Spirit

2019 Men's World Ice Hockey Championship
Head coach:  Alain Vigneault
Assistant coach:  Kirk Muller
Assistant coach:  Lindy Ruff
Assistant coach:  Dave Hakstol

Goaltender
 Matt Murray – Pittsburgh Penguins
 Carter Hart – Philadelphia Flyers
 Mackenzie Blackwood – New Jersey Devils

Defence
 Dante Fabbro – Nashville Predators
 Shea Theodore – Vegas Golden Knights
 Damon Severson – New Jersey Devils
 Darnell Nurse – Edmonton Oilers
 Troy Stecher – Vancouver Canucks
 Thomas Chabot – Ottawa Senators
 Brandon Montour – Buffalo Sabres
 Philippe Myers – Philadelphia Flyers

Forward
 Mark Stone (A) – Vegas Golden Knights
 Sam Reinhart – Buffalo Sabres
 Sean Couturier (A) – Philadelphia Flyers
 Adam Henrique – Anaheim Ducks
 Jared McCann – Pittsburgh Penguins
 Dylan Strome – Chicago Blackhawks
 Mathieu Joseph – Tampa Bay Lightning
 Anthony Mantha – Detroit Red Wings
 Tyler Bertuzzi – Detroit Red Wings
 Anthony Cirelli – Tampa Bay Lightning
 Jonathan Marchessault – Vegas Golden Knights
 Kyle Turris (C) – Nashville Predators
 Pierre-Luc Dubois – Columbus Blue Jackets
 Tyson Jost – Colorado Avalanche

2018 Men's World Ice Hockey Championship
Head coach:  Bill Peters
Assistant coach:  Bob Boughner

Goaltender
 Michael DiPietro – Windsor Spitfires
 Curtis McElhinney – Carolina Hurricanes
 Darcy Kuemper – Arizona Coyotes

Defence
 Joel Edmundson – St. Louis Blues
 Aaron Ekblad – Florida Panthers
 Ryan Pulock – New York Islanders
 Darnell Nurse – Edmonton Oilers
 Ryan Murray – Columbus Blue Jackets
 Thomas Chabot – Ottawa Senators
 Colton Parayko – St. Louis Blues
 Marc–Édouard Vlasic – San Jose Sharks

Forward
 Jordan Eberle – New York Islanders
 Brayden Schenn (A) – St. Louis Blues
 Josh Bailey – New York Islanders
 Mathew Barzal – New York Islanders
 Jaden Schwartz – St. Louis Blues
 Pierre-Luc Dubois – Columbus Blue Jackets
 Tyson Jost – Colorado Avalanche
 Jean-Gabriel Pageau – Ottawa Senators
 Bo Horvat – Vancouver Canucks
 Anthony Beauvillier – New York Islanders
 Ryan O'Reilly (A) – Buffalo Sabres
 Ryan Nugent-Hopkins – Edmonton Oilers
 Connor McDavid (C) – Edmonton Oilers
 Kyle Turris – Nashville Predators

2018 Winter Olympics
Roster for the 2018 Winter Olympics. NHL players were not allowed to participate.

2017 Men's World Ice Hockey Championship
Head coach:  Jon Cooper
Assistant coach:  Gerard Gallant
Assistant coach:  Dave Hakstol
Assistant coach:  Dave King

Goaltender
 Eric Comrie – Manitoba Moose
 Chad Johnson – Calgary Flames
 Calvin Pickard – Colorado Avalanche

Defence
 Tyson Barrie – Colorado Avalanche
 Jason Demers – Florida Panthers
 Josh Morrissey – Winnipeg Jets
 Colton Parayko – St. Louis Blues
 Mike Matheson – Florida Panthers
 Calvin de Haan – New York Islanders
 Chris Lee – Metallurg Magnitogorsk
 Marc–Édouard Vlasic (A) – San Jose Sharks

Forward
 Matt Duchene – Colorado Avalanche
 Brayden Schenn – Philadelphia Flyers
 Travis Konecny – Philadelphia Flyers
 Sean Couturier – Philadelphia Flyers
 Mitch Marner – Toronto Maple Leafs
 Wayne Simmonds – Philadelphia Flyers
 Brayden Point – Tampa Bay Lightning
 Claude Giroux (C) – Philadelphia Flyers
 Nathan MacKinnon – Colorado Avalanche
 Jeff Skinner – Carolina Hurricanes
 Mark Scheifele – Winnipeg Jets
 Alexander Killorn – Tampa Bay Lightning
 Ryan O'Reilly (A)– Buffalo Sabres

2016 World Cup of Hockey
Head coach: Mike Babcock

Duncan Keith, Jeff Carter, Jamie Benn, and Tyler Seguin were all originally selected, but could not participate due to injury. They were replaced by Jay Bouwmeester, Corey Perry, Logan Couture, and Ryan O'Reilly, respectively.

2016 Men's World Ice Hockey Championship
Head coach:  Bill Peters
Assistant coach:  Dave Cameron
Assistant coach:  Mike Yeo

Goaltender
 Calvin Pickard – Colorado Avalanche
 Cam Talbot – New York Rangers

Defence
 Cody Ceci – Ottawa Senators
 Ryan Ellis – Nashville Predators
 Mike Matheson – Florida Panthers
 Christopher Tanev – Vancouver Canucks
 Ben Hutton – Vancouver Canucks
 Matt Dumba – Minnesota Wild
 Ryan Murray – Columbus Blue Jackets
 Morgan Rielly – Toronto Maple Leafs

Forward
 Taylor Hall – Edmonton Oilers
 Matt Duchene (A) – Colorado Avalanche
 Brendan Gallagher – Montreal Canadiens
 Max Domi – Arizona Coyotes
 Derick Brassard – New York Rangers
 Sam Reinhart – Buffalo Sabres
 Corey Perry (C) – Anaheim Ducks
 Boone Jenner – Columbus Blue Jackets
 Mark Scheifele – Winnipeg Jets
 Mark Stone – Ottawa Senators
 Brad Marchand – Boston Bruins
 Ryan O'Reilly (A)– Buffalo Sabres
 Connor McDavid – Edmonton Oilers

2015 Men's World Ice Hockey Championship
Head coach:  Todd McLellan
Assistant coach:  Peter DeBoer
Assistant coach:  Bill Peters
Assistant coach:  Jay Woodcroft

Goaltender
 Martin Jones – Los Angeles Kings
 Mike Smith – Arizona Coyotes

Defence
 Dan Hamhuis (A) – Vancouver Canucks
 Aaron Ekblad – Florida Panthers
 Jake Muzzin – Los Angeles Kings
 Tyson Barrie – Colorado Avalanche
 Patrick Wiercioch – Ottawa Senators
 David Savard – Columbus Blue Jackets
 Brent Burns – San Jose Sharks

Forward
 Tyler Seguin – Dallas Stars
 Taylor Hall – Edmonton Oilers
 Sean Couturier – Philadelphia Flyers
 Matt Duchene – Colorado Avalanche
 Brayden Schenn – Philadelphia Flyers
 Jordan Eberle – Edmonton Oilers
 Cody Eakin – Dallas Stars
 Claude Giroux – Philadelphia Flyers
 Nathan MacKinnon – Colorado Avalanche
 Tyler Ennis – Buffalo Sabres
 Tyler Toffoli – Los Angeles Kings
 Ryan O'Reilly – Colorado Avalanche
 Sidney Crosby (C) – Pittsburgh Penguins
 Jason Spezza (A) – Dallas Stars

2014 Men's World Ice Hockey Championship
Head coach:  Dave Tippett
Assistant coach:  Peter DeBoer
Assistant coach:  Paul Maurice

Goaltender
 Ben Scrivens – Edmonton Oilers
 James Reimer – Toronto Maple Leafs
 Justin Peters – Carolina Hurricanes

Defence
 Marc Methot – Ottawa Senators
 Ryan Ellis – Nashville Predators
 Jason Garrison – Vancouver Canucks
 Kevin Bieksa – Vancouver Canucks
 Morgan Rielly – Toronto Maple Leafs
 Erik Gudbranson – Florida Panthers
 Tyler Myers – Buffalo Sabres

Forward
 Kyle Turris – Ottawa Senators
 Brayden Schenn – Philadelphia Flyers
 Jonathan Huberdeau – Florida Panthers
 Alex Burrows – Vancouver Canucks
 Cody Hodgson – Buffalo Sabres
 Troy Brouwer – Washington Capitals
 Matt Read – Philadelphia Flyers
 Sean Monahan – Calgary Flames
 Jason Chimera – Washington Capitals
 Nathan MacKinnon – Colorado Avalanche
 Joel Ward – Washington Capitals
 Nazem Kadri – Toronto Maple Leafs
 Mark Scheifele – Winnipeg Jets

2014 Winter Olympics
Head coach: Mike Babcock

2013 Men's World Ice Hockey Championship
Head coach:  Lindy Ruff
Assistant coach:  Doug Shedden
Assistant coach:  Dave Tippett
Assistant coach:  Barry Trotz

Goaltender
 Devan Dubnyk – Edmonton Oilers
 Michael Garnett – Traktor Chelyabinsk
 Mike Smith – Phoenix Coyotes

Defence
 T. J. Brodie – Calgary Flames
 Brian Campbell – Florida Panthers
 Brenden Dillon – Dallas Stars
 Dan Hamhuis – Vancouver Canucks
 Jay Harrison – Carolina Hurricanes
 Stéphane Robidas (A) – Dallas Stars
 Luke Schenn – Philadelphia Flyers
 Justin Schultz – Edmonton Oilers
 P. K. Subban – Montreal Canadiens

Forward
 Matt Duchene – Colorado Avalanche
 Jordan Eberle – Edmonton Oilers
 Claude Giroux – Philadelphia Flyers
 Taylor Hall – Edmonton Oilers
 Andrew Ladd (A) – Winnipeg Jets
 Ryan O'Reilly – Colorado Avalanche
 Matt Read – Philadelphia Flyers
 Jaden Schwartz – St. Louis Blues
 Wayne Simmonds – Philadelphia Flyers
 Jeff Skinner – Carolina Hurricanes
 Eric Staal (C) – Carolina Hurricanes
 Jordan Staal – Carolina Hurricanes
 Martin St. Louis – Tampa Bay Lightning

2012 Men's World Ice Hockey Championship
Head coach:  Brent Sutter
Assistant coach:  Kirk Muller
Assistant coach:  Guy Boucher

Goaltender
 Devan Dubnyk – Edmonton Oilers
 Matt Hackett – Minnesota Wild
 Cam Ward – Carolina Hurricanes

Defence
 Jay Bouwmeester – Calgary Flames
 Marc Methot – Columbus Blue Jackets
 Duncan Keith – Chicago Blackhawks
 Ryan Murray – Everett Silvertips
 Dion Phaneuf – Toronto Maple Leafs
 Kyle Quincey – Detroit Red Wings
 Luke Schenn – Toronto Maple Leafs
 P. K. Subban – Montreal Canadiens
 Marc–Édouard Vlasic – San Jose Sharks

Forward
 Jamie Benn – Dallas Stars
 Alexandre Burrows (A) – Vancouver Canucks
 Jordan Eberle – Edmonton Oilers
 Ryan Getzlaf (C) – Anaheim Ducks
 Evander Kane – Winnipeg Jets
 Andrew Ladd – Winnipeg Jets
 Ryan Nugent–Hopkins – Edmonton Oilers
 Ryan O'Reilly – Colorado Avalanche
 Corey Perry – Anaheim Ducks
 Teddy Purcell – Tampa Bay Lightning
 John Tavares – New York Islanders
 Patrick Sharp (A) – Chicago Blackhawks
 Jeff Skinner – Carolina Hurricanes

2011 Men's World Ice Hockey Championship
Head coach:  Ken Hitchcock
Assistant coach:  Scott Arniel
Assistant coach:  Peter DeBoer

Goaltender
 Jonathan Bernier – Los Angeles Kings
 Devan Dubnyk – Edmonton Oilers
 James Reimer – Toronto Maple Leafs

Defence
 Brent Burns – San Jose Sharks
 Carlo Colaiacovo – St. Louis Blues
 Marc–André Gragnani – Buffalo Sabres
 Marc Methot – Columbus Blue Jackets
 Dion Phaneuf (A) – Toronto Maple Leafs
 Alex Pietrangelo – St. Louis Blues
 Mario Scalzo – Adler Mannheim
 Luke Schenn – Toronto Maple Leafs

Forward
 Cal Clutterbuck – Minnesota Wild
 Matt Duchene – Colorado Avalanche
 Jordan Eberle – Edmonton Oilers
 Evander Kane – Winnipeg Jets
 Andrew Ladd (A) – Winnipeg Jets
 Rick Nash (C) – Columbus Blue Jackets
 James Neal – Dallas Stars
 Jason Spezza (A) – Ottawa Senators
 John Tavares – New York Islanders
 Jeff Skinner – Carolina Hurricanes
 Chris Stewart – St. Louis Blues
 Antoine Vermette – Phoenix Coyotes
 Travis Zajac (A) – New Jersey Devils

2010 Men's World Ice Hockey Championship
Head coach:  Craig MacTavish
Assistant coach:  Peter DeBoer
Assistant coach:  Billy Moores

Goaltender
 Devan Dubnyk – Edmonton Oilers
 Chad Johnson – New York Rangers
 Chris Mason – St. Louis Blues

Defence
 François Beauchemin – Toronto Maple Leafs
 Brent Burns – Minnesota Wild
 Kyle Cumiskey – Colorado Avalanche
 Michael Del Zotto – New York Rangers
 Mark Giordano – Calgary Flames
 Tyler Myers – Buffalo Sabres
 Kris Russell – Columbus Blue Jackets
 Marc Staal – New York Rangers

Forward
 Rene Bourque – Calgary Flames
 Steve Downie – Tampa Bay Lightning
 Matt Duchene – Colorado Avalanche
 Jordan Eberle – Regina Pats
 Evander Kane – Atlanta Thrashers
 Brooks Laich – Washington Capitals
 Steve Ott – Dallas Stars
 Corey Perry – Anaheim Ducks
 Mason Raymond – Vancouver Canucks
 Rich Peverley – Atlanta Thrashers
 Ryan Smyth – Los Angeles Kings
 Steven Stamkos – Tampa Bay Lightning
 John Tavares – New York Islanders
 Ray Whitney – Carolina Hurricanes

2010 Winter Olympics
Head coach: Mike Babcock

2009 Men's World Ice Hockey Championship
Head coach: Lindy Ruff

Goaltender
Josh Harding – Minnesota Wild
Chris Mason – St. Louis Blues
Dwayne Roloson – Edmonton Oilers

Defence
Braydon Coburn – Philadelphia Flyers
Drew Doughty – Los Angeles Kings
Dan Hamhuis – Nashville Predators
Joel Kwiatkowski – Severstal Cherepovets
Chris Phillips – Ottawa Senators
Luke Schenn – Toronto Maple Leafs
Shea Weber – Nashville Predators
Ian White – Toronto Maple Leafs
Marc–Édouard Vlasic – San Jose Sharks

Forward
Colby Armstrong – Atlanta Thrashers
Shane Doan (C) – Phoenix Coyotes
Mike Fisher – Ottawa Senators
Dany Heatley – Ottawa Senators
Shawn Horcoff – Edmonton Oilers
Matthew Lombardi – Phoenix Coyotes
James Neal – Dallas Stars
Derek Roy – Buffalo Sabres
Martin St. Louis – Tampa Bay Lightning
Jason Spezza – Ottawa Senators
Steven Stamkos – Tampa Bay Lightning
Scottie Upshall – Phoenix Coyotes
Travis Zajac – New Jersey Devils

2008 Men's World Ice Hockey Championship
Head coach: Ken Hitchcock

Goaltender
Mathieu Garon – Edmonton Oilers
Pascal Leclaire – Columbus Blue Jackets
Cam Ward – Carolina Hurricanes

Defence
Jay Bouwmeester – Florida Panthers
Brent Burns – Minnesota Wild
Mark Giordano – Dynamo Moscow
Mike Green – Washington Capitals
Dan Hamhuis – Nashville Predators
Ed Jovanovski – Phoenix Coyotes
Duncan Keith – Chicago Blackhawks
Steve Staios – Edmonton Oilers

Forward
Jason Chimera – Columbus Blue Jackets
Shane Doan – Phoenix Coyotes
Sam Gagner – Edmonton Oilers
Ryan Getzlaf – Anaheim Ducks
Dany Heatley – Ottawa Senators
Chris Kunitz – Anaheim Ducks
Jamal Mayers – St. Louis Blues
Rick Nash – Columbus Blue Jackets
Derek Roy – Buffalo Sabres
Patrick Sharp – Chicago Blackhawks
Jason Spezza – Ottawa Senators
Martin St. Louis – Tampa Bay Lightning
Eric Staal – Carolina Hurricanes
Jonathan Toews – Chicago Blackhawks

2007 Men's World Ice Hockey Championship
Head coach: Andy Murray

Goaltenders
30 Cam Ward – Carolina Hurricanes
50 Dwayne Roloson – Edmonton Oilers

Defencemen

2 Dan Hamhuis – Nashville Predators
3 Dion Phaneuf – Calgary Flames
4 Eric Brewer (A) – St. Louis Blues
5 Barret Jackman – St. Louis Blues
6 Shea Weber – Nashville Predators
23 Cory Murphy – HIFK
55 Nick Schultz (A) – Minnesota Wild

Forwards
9 Jay McClement – St. Louis Blues
10 Jordan Staal – Pittsburgh Penguins
11 Justin Williams – Carolina Hurricanes
12 Eric Staal – Carolina Hurricanes
13 Michael Cammalleri (A) – Los Angeles Kings
16 Jonathan Toews – University of North Dakota
18 Matthew Lombardi – Calgary Flames
21 Shane Doan (C) – Phoenix Coyotes
20 Colby Armstrong – Pittsburgh Penguins
21 Jamal Mayers – St. Louis Blues
25 Jason Chimera – Columbus Blue Jackets
61 Rick Nash – Columbus Blue Jackets

2006 Men's World Ice Hockey Championship
Head coach: Marc Habscheid

Goaltenders
35 Alex Auld – Vancouver Canucks
30 Marc Denis – Columbus Blue Jackets

Defencemen
16 Trevor Daley – Dallas Stars
25 Micki DuPont – Eisbären Berlin
2   Dan Hamhuis – Nashville Predators
3   Stéphane Robidas (A) – Dallas Stars
55 Nick Schultz – Minnesota Wild
5   Brent Seabrook – Chicago Blackhawks
6   Brad Stuart – Boston Bruins

Forwards
37 Patrice Bergeron – Boston Bruins
26 Brad Boyes – Boston Bruins
19 Kyle Calder (A) – Chicago Blackhawks
13 Michael Cammalleri – Los Angeles Kings
  7 Jeff Carter – Philadelphia Flyers
89 Mike Comrie – Phoenix Coyotes
87 Sidney Crosby (A) – Pittsburgh Penguins
17 Scott Hartnell – Nashville Predators
12 Glen Metropolit – HC Lugano
27 Matt Pettinger – Washington Capitals
18 Mike Richards – Philadelphia Flyers
14 Brendan Shanahan (C) – Detroit Red Wings
29 Jason Williams – Detroit Red Wings

2006 Winter Olympics
Head coach: Pat Quinn

2005 Men's World Ice Hockey Championship
Head coach: Marc Habscheid
Dan Boyle – Tampa Bay Lightning
Martin Brodeur – New Jersey Devils
Shane Doan – Phoenix Coyotes
Kris Draper – Detroit Red Wings
Mike Fisher – Ottawa Senators
Simon Gagné – Philadelphia Flyers
Scott Hannan – San Jose Sharks
Dany Heatley – Atlanta Thrashers
Ed Jovanovski (A) – Vancouver Canucks
Roberto Luongo – Florida Panthers
Kirk Maltby – Detroit Red Wings
Patrick Marleau (A) – San Jose Sharks
Brendan Morrison – Vancouver Canucks
Brenden Morrow – Dallas Stars
Rick Nash – Columbus Blue Jackets
Chris Phillips – Ottawa Senators
Wade Redden – Ottawa Senators
Robyn Regehr – Calgary Flames
Ryan Smyth (C) – Edmonton Oilers
Sheldon Souray – Montreal Canadiens
Joe Thornton (A) – Boston Bruins
Jordin Tootoo – Nashville Predators
Marty Turco – Dallas Stars
Scott Walker – Nashville Predators

2004 World Cup of Hockey

Head coach: Pat Quinn
Roberto Luongo – Florida Panthers
Rob Blake (A) – Colorado Avalanche
Jay Bouwmeester – Florida Panthers
Eric Brewer – Edmonton Oilers
Martin Brodeur – New Jersey Devils
Shane Doan – Phoenix Coyotes
Kris Draper – Detroit Red Wings
Scott Hannan – San Jose Sharks
Adam Foote (A) – Colorado Avalanche
Simon Gagné – Philadelphia Flyers
Dany Heatley – Atlanta Thrashers
Jarome Iginla (A) – Calgary Flames
Ed Jovanovski – Vancouver Canucks
Mario Lemieux (C) – Pittsburgh Penguins
Kirk Maltby – Detroit Red Wings
Patrick Marleau – San Jose Sharks
Brenden Morrow – Dallas Stars
Scott Niedermayer – New Jersey Devils
Wade Redden – Ottawa Senators
Robyn Regehr – Calgary Flames
Brad Richards – Tampa Bay Lightning
Joe Sakic (A) – Colorado Avalanche
Ryan Smyth – Edmonton Oilers
Martin St. Louis – Tampa Bay Lightning
José Théodore – Montreal Canadiens
Joe Thornton – Boston Bruins
Vincent Lecavalier – Tampa Bay Lightning

2004 Men's World Ice Hockey Championship
Head coach: Mike Babcock
Patrice Bergeron – Boston Bruins
Jay Bouwmeester – Florida Panthers
Daniel Brière – Buffalo Sabres
Eric Brewer – Edmonton Oilers
Matt Cooke – Vancouver Canucks
Marc Denis – Columbus Blue Jackets
J. P. Dumont – Buffalo Sabres
Jean–Sébastien Giguère – Mighty Ducks of Anaheim
Jeff Friesen – New Jersey Devils
Dany Heatley – Atlanta Thrashers
Shawn Horcoff – Edmonton Oilers
Roberto Luongo – Florida Panthers
Willie Mitchell – Minnesota Wild
Derek Morris – Colorado Avalanche
Brendan Morrison – Vancouver Canucks
Brenden Morrow – Dallas Stars
Glen Murray – Boston Bruins
Rob Niedermayer – Mighty Ducks of Anaheim
Scott Niedermayer – New Jersey Devils
Nick Schultz – Minnesota Wild
Ryan Smyth (C) – Edmonton Oilers
Steve Staios – Edmonton Oilers
Justin Williams – Philadelphia Flyers

2003 Men's World Ice Hockey Championship

Head coach: Andy Murray
Martin Biron – Buffalo Sabres
Jay Bouwmeester – Florida Panthers
Daniel Brière – Phoenix Coyotes
Eric Brewer – Edmonton Oilers
Sean Burke – Phoenix Coyotes
Kyle Calder – Chicago Blackhawks
Anson Carter – New York Rangers
Mike Comrie – Edmonton Oilers
Mathieu Dandenault – Detroit Red Wings
Shane Doan – Phoenix Coyotes
Kris Draper – Detroit Red Wings
Dany Heatley – Atlanta Thrashers
Jamie Heward – Genève–Servette HC
Shawn Horcoff – Edmonton Oilers
Krys Kolanos – Phoenix Coyotes
Roberto Luongo– Florida Panthers
Patrick Marleau – San Jose Sharks
Kirk Maltby – Detroit Red Wings
Craig Rivet – Montreal Canadiens
Ryan Smyth (C) – Edmonton Oilers
Steve Staios – Edmonton Oilers

2002 Men's World Ice Hockey Championship
Head coach: Wayne Fleming
Eric Brewer
Kyle Calder
Dan Cleary
Mike Comrie
Brad Ference
Jean–Sébastien Giguère
Dany Heatley
Manny Malhotra
Richard Matvichuk
Andy McDonald
Dan McGillis
Brenden Morrow
James Patrick
Jamie Ram
Peter Schaefer
Brad Schlegel
Ryan Smyth (C)
Steve Staios
Jamie Storr
Darryl Sydor
Marty Turco
Ray Whitney
Justin Williams
Jamie Wright
Tyler Wright

2002 Winter Olympics

Head coach: Pat Quinn
Ed Belfour – Dallas Stars
Rob Blake – Colorado Avalanche
Eric Brewer – Edmonton Oilers
Martin Brodeur – New Jersey Devils
Theoren Fleury – New York Rangers
Adam Foote – Colorado Avalanche
Simon Gagné – Philadelphia Flyers
Jarome Iginla – Calgary Flames
Curtis Joseph – Toronto Maple Leafs
Ed Jovanovski – Vancouver Canucks
Paul Kariya – Mighty Ducks of Anaheim
Mario Lemieux (C) – Pittsburgh Penguins
Eric Lindros – New York Rangers
Al MacInnis – St. Louis Blues
Scott Niedermayer – New Jersey Devils
Joe Nieuwendyk – Dallas Stars
Owen Nolan – San Jose Sharks
Michael Peca (A) – New York Islanders
Chris Pronger (A) – St. Louis Blues
Joe Sakic (A) – Colorado Avalanche
Brendan Shanahan – Detroit Red Wings
Ryan Smyth – Edmonton Oilers
Steve Yzerman (A) – Detroit Red Wings

2001 Men's World Ice Hockey Championship
Head coach: Wayne Fleming
Fred Brathwaite
Eric Brewer
Dan Cloutier
Kris Draper
Jeff Friesen
Jean–Sébastien Giguère
Brad Isbister
Vincent Lecavalier
Roberto Luongo
Patrick Marleau
Daniel Marois
Kyle McLaren
Derek Morris
Brenden Morrow
Rem Murray
Michael Peca (C)
Wade Redden
Brad Richards
Stéphane Robidas
Jason Smith
Ryan Smyth (C)
Brad Stuart
Steve Sullivan
Joe Thornton
Scott Walker
Wes Walz

2000 Men's World Ice Hockey Championship
Head coach: Tom Renney
Peter Allen
Adrian Aucoin
Todd Bertuzzi
Fred Brathwaite
Curtis Brown
Kris Draper
Jeff Finley
Brad Isbister
Mike Johnson
Ed Jovanovski
Martin Lapointe
Trevor Letowski
Jamal Mayers
Dean McAmmond
Brendan Morrison
Larry Murphy
Chris Phillips
Jamie Ram
Robyn Regehr
Peter Schaefer
Mike Sillinger (C)
Ryan Smyth
Steve Sullivan
José Théodore
Patrick Traverse
Yannick Tremblay

1999 Men's World Ice Hockey Championship
Head coach: Mike Johnston
Rob Blake (C)
Doug Bodger
Fred Brathwaite
Éric Dazé
Shane Doan
Jeff Friesen
Adam Graves
Claude Lapointe
Patrick Marleau
Bryan McCabe
Derek Morris
Rob Niedermayer
Sean O'Donnell
Stéphane Quintal
Wade Redden
Brian Savage
Ryan Smyth
Cory Stillman
Chris Szysky
Rick Tabaracci
Scott Thornton
Ron Tugnutt
Scott Walker
Ray Whitney

1998 Men's World Ice Hockey Championship
Head coach: Andy Murray
Todd Bertuzzi
Rob Blake
Christian Bronsard
Cory Cross
Éric Dazé
Mickey Elick
Nelson Emerson
Martin Gélinas
Chris Gratton
Travis Green
Jeff Hackett
Ed Jovanovski
Trevor Linden
Bryan McCabe
Gord Murphy
Glen Murray
James Patrick
Félix Potvin
Keith Primeau (C)
Steve Rucchin
Ray Whitney
Rob Zamuner

1998 Winter Olympics
Head coach: Marc Crawford
Rob Blake – Los Angeles Kings
Ray Bourque – Boston Bruins
Rod Brind'Amour – Philadelphia Flyers
Martin Brodeur – New Jersey Devils
Shayne Corson – Montreal Canadiens
Éric Desjardins – Philadelphia Flyers
Theoren Fleury – Calgary Flames
Adam Foote – Colorado Avalanche
Wayne Gretzky – New York Rangers
Curtis Joseph – Edmonton Oilers
Trevor Linden – New York Islanders
Eric Lindros (C) – Philadelphia Flyers
Al MacInnis – St. Louis Blues
Joe Nieuwendyk – Dallas Stars
Keith Primeau – Carolina Hurricanes
Chris Pronger – St. Louis Blues
Mark Recchi – Montreal Canadiens
Patrick Roy – Colorado Avalanche
Joe Sakic (A) – Colorado Avalanche
Brendan Shanahan – Detroit Red Wings
Scott Stevens (A) – New Jersey Devils
Steve Yzerman (A) – Detroit Red Wings
Rob Zamuner– Tampa Bay Lightning

1997 Men's World Ice Hockey Championship

Head coach: Andy Murray
Rob Blake – Los Angeles Kings
Joel Bouchard – Calgary Flames
Sean Burke – Hartford Whalers
Anson Carter – Boston Bruins
Steve Chiasson – Hartford Whalers
Cory Cross – Tampa Bay Lightning
Shean Donovan – San Jose Sharks
Bob Errey – San Jose Sharks
Dean Evason (C) – Canadian National Team
Éric Fichaud – New York Islanders
Jeff Friesen – San Jose Sharks
Chris Gratton – Tampa Bay Lightning
Travis Green – New York Islanders
Jarome Iginla – Calgary Flames
Bryan McCabe – New York Islanders
Owen Nolan – San Jose Sharks
Keith Primeau – Hartford Whalers
Chris Pronger – St. Louis Blues
Mark Recchi – Montreal Canadiens
Geoff Sanderson – Hartford Whalers
Don Sweeney – Boston Bruins
Rick Tabaracci – Tampa Bay Lightning
Rob Zamuner – Tampa Bay Lightning

1996 World Cup of Hockey
Head coach: Glen Sather

Goaltender
Martin Brodeur – New Jersey Devils
Curtis Joseph – Edmonton Oilers
Bill Ranford – Boston Bruins
Defence
Rob Blake – Los Angeles Kings
Paul Coffey – Detroit Red Wings
Sylvain Côté – Washington Capitals
Éric Desjardins – Philadelphia Flyers
Adam Foote – Colorado Avalanche
Scott Niedermayer – New Jersey Devils
Lyle Odelein – Montreal Canadiens
Scott Stevens – New Jersey Devils
Ed Jovanovski (A – did not play) – Florida Panthers
Forward
Rod Brind'Amour – Philadelphia Flyers
Vincent Damphousse – Montreal Canadiens
Theo Fleury – Calgary Flames
Adam Graves – New York Rangers
Wayne Gretzky (C) – New York Rangers
Claude Lemieux – Colorado Avalanche
Trevor Linden – Vancouver Canucks
Eric Lindros – Philadelphia Flyers
Mark Messier – New York Rangers
Keith Primeau – Detroit Red Wings
Joe Sakic – Colorado Avalanche
Brendan Shanahan – Hartford Whalers
Pat Verbeek – New York Rangers
Steve Yzerman – Detroit Red Wings
Jason Arnott (A – did not play) – Edmonton Oilers
Éric Dazé (A – did not play) – Chicago Blackhawks

1996 Men's World Ice Hockey Championship
Head coach: Tom Renney
Doug Bodger
Martin Brodeur
Kelly Buchberger
Andrew Cassels
Jason Dawe
Steve Duchesne
Ray Ferraro
Jeff Friesen
Garry Galley
Travis Green
Jean–François Jomphe
Curtis Joseph
Paul Kariya
David Matsos
Brad May
Derek Mayer
Dean McAmmond
Yanic Perreault
Luke Richardson
Darryl Sydor
Steve Thomas
Andrew Verner
Glen Wesley

1995 Men's World Ice Hockey Championship
Head coach: Tom Renney
Goaltenders
Corey Hirsch – Binghamton Rangers
Dwayne Roloson – Saint John Flames
Andrew Verner – Canadian National Team
Defense
Greg Andrusak – Detroit Vipers
Peter Allen – Canadian National Team
Dale DeGray – Cleveland Lumberjacks
Len Esau – Saint John Flames
Jamie Heward – Canadian National Team
Brad Schlegel – Canadian National Team
Tom Tilley – Indianapolis Ice
Brian Tutt (C) – Ilves Tampere
Forwards
Luciano Borsato – Springfield Falcons
Chris Bright – Canadian National Team
Rich Chernomaz – St. John's Maple Leafs
Brandon Convery – St. John's Maple Leafs
Iain Fraser
Mark Freer – Houston Aeros
Chris Govedaris – Adirondack Red Wings
Todd Hlushko – Saint John Flames
Jean–François Jomphe – Canadian National Team
Ralph Intranuovo – Cape Breton Oilers
Mike Maneluk – Canadian National Team
Andrew McKim – Adirondack Red Wings

1994 Men's World Ice Hockey Championship

Head coach: George Kingston
Jason Arnott – Edmonton Oilers
Marc Bergevin – Tampa Bay Lightning
Rob Blake – Los Angeles Kings
Rod Brind'Amour – Philadelphia Flyers
Kelly Buchberger – Edmonton Oilers
Shayne Corson – Edmonton Oilers
Bobby Dollas – Mighty Ducks of Anaheim
Steve Duchesne – St. Louis Blues
Nelson Emerson – Winnipeg Jets
Stéphane Fiset – Quebec Nordiques
Paul Kariya – Canadian National Team
Yves Racine – Philadelphia Flyers
Bill Ranford – Edmonton Oilers
Mike Ricci – Quebec Nordiques
Luke Richardson – Edmonton Oilers
Luc Robitaille (C) – Los Angeles Kings
Joe Sakic – Quebec Nordiques
Geoff Sanderson – Hartford Whalers
Brendan Shanahan – St. Louis Blues
Jamie Storr – Owen Sound Platers
Darryl Sydor – Los Angeles Kings
Steve Thomas – New York Islanders
Pat Verbeek – Hartford Whalers

1994 Winter Olympics
Head coach: Tom Renney
Mark Astley
Adrian Aucoin
David Harlock
Corey Hirsch
Todd Hlushko
Greg Johnson
Fabian Joseph
Paul Kariya
Chris Kontos
Manny Legacé
Ken Lovsin
Derek Mayer
Petr Nedvěd
Dwayne Norris
Greg Parks
Allain Roy
Jean–Yves Roy
Brian Savage
Brad Schlegel
Wally Schreiber
Chris Therien
Todd Warriner
Brad Werenka

1993 Men's World Ice Hockey Championship
Head coach: Mike Keenan
Brian Benning
Rod Brind'Amour
Kelly Buchberger
Terry Carkner
Shayne Corson
Kevin Dineen
Dave Gagner
Garry Galley
Mike Gartner
Adam Graves (C)
Greg Johnson
Paul Kariya
Eric Lindros
Norm MacIver
Dave Manson
Derek Mayer
Bill Ranford
Mark Recchi
Geoff Sanderson
Brian Savage
Geoff Smith
Ron Tugnutt

1992 Men's World Ice Hockey Championship
Head coach: Dave King
Keith Acton
Glenn Anderson (C)
Bob Bassen
Rod Brind'Amour
Garth Butcher
Sylvain Côté
Nelson Emerson
Pat Falloon
Ray Ferraro
Todd Gill
Marc Habscheid
Ron Hextall
Kerry Huffman
Trevor Kidd
Derek King
Chris Lindberg
Brad Schlegel
Randy Smith
Rick Tabaracci
Steve Thomas
Brian Tutt
Jason Woolley
Trent Yawney

1992 Winter Olympics
Head coach: Dave King
Dave Archibald
Todd Brost
Sean Burke
Kevin Dahl
Curt Giles
Dave Hannan
Gord Hynes
Fabian Joseph
Joé Juneau
Trevor Kidd
Patrick Lebeau
Chris Lindberg
Eric Lindros
Kent Manderville
Adrien Plavsic
Dan Ratushny
Sam Saint–Laurent
Brad Schlegel
Wally Schreiber
Randy Smith
Dave Tippett
Brian Tutt
Jason Woolley

1991 Canada Cup

Head coach: Mike Keenan
Ed Belfour – Chicago Blackhawks
Sean Burke – New Jersey Devils
Paul Coffey (A) – Pittsburgh Penguins
Shayne Corson – Montreal Canadiens
Russ Courtnall – Montreal Canadiens
Éric Desjardins – Montreal Canadiens
Theoren Fleury – Calgary Flames
Dirk Graham – Chicago Blackhawks
Wayne Gretzky (C) – Los Angeles Kings
Dale Hawerchuk (A) – Buffalo Sabres
Steve Larmer – Chicago Blackhawks
Eric Lindros – Oshawa Generals
Al MacInnis – Calgary Flames
Mark Messier (A) – Edmonton Oilers
Larry Murphy – Pittsburgh Penguins
Bill Ranford – Edmonton Oilers
Luc Robitaille – Los Angeles Kings
Brendan Shanahan – St. Louis Blues
Steve Smith – Edmonton Oilers
Scott Stevens – New Jersey Devils
Brent Sutter – New York Islanders
Mark Tinordi – Minnesota North Stars
Rick Tocchet – Pittsburgh Penguins

1991 Men's World Ice Hockey Championship
Head coach: Dave King
Dave Archibald
Craig Billington
Rob Blake
Steve Bozek
Sean Burke
Geoff Courtnall
Russ Courtnall
Murray Craven
Theoren Fleury
Steve Konroyd
Steve Larmer
Doug Lidster (C)
Trevor Linden
Jamie Macoun
Ric Nattress
Yves Racine
Cliff Ronning
Joe Sakic
Brad Schlegel
Randy Smith
Steve Thomas
Mike Vernon
Trent Yawney

1990 Men's World Ice Hockey Championship
Head coach: Dave King
Keith Acton
Greg Adams
Brian Bellows
Shawn Burr
Paul Coffey (C)
Murray Craven
John Cullen
Bob Essensa
Theoren Fleury
Doug Gilmour
Rick Green
Curtis Leschyshyn
Doug Lidster
Al MacInnis
Jamie Macoun
Kirk McLean
Joe Nieuwendyk
Michel Petit
Mark Recchi
Ron Sutter
Rick Tocchet
Ken Wregget
Steve Yzerman (C)

1989 Men's World Ice Hockey Championship
Head coach: Dave King
Glenn Anderson
Brent Ashton
Dave Babych
Brian Bellows
Sean Burke
Randy Carlyle
Ken Daneyko
Kevin Dineen
Dave Ellett
Ray Ferraro
Grant Fuhr
Gerard Gallant
Dale Hawerchuk (C)
John MacLean
Mario Marois
Andrew McBain
Mark Messier
Kirk Muller (C)
James Patrick
Peter Sidorkiewicz
Scott Stevens
Pat Verbeek
Steve Yzerman (C)

1988 Winter Olympics
Head coach: Dave King
Ken Berry
Serge Boisvert
Brian Bradley
Sean Burke
Chris Felix
Randy Gregg
Marc Habscheid
Bob Joyce
Vaughn Karpan
Merlin Malinowski
Andy Moog
Jim Peplinski
Serge Roy
Wally Schreiber
Gord Sherven
Tony Stiles
Steve Tambellini
Claude Vilgrain
Tim Watters
Ken Yaremchuk
Trent Yawney (C)
Zarley Zalapski

1987 Canada Cup

Head coach: Mike Keenan
Glenn Anderson – Edmonton Oilers
Raymond Bourque (A) – Boston Bruins
Doug Crossman – Philadelphia Flyers
Paul Coffey – Edmonton Oilers
Kevin Dineen – Hartford Whalers
Grant Fuhr – Edmonton Oilers
Mike Gartner – Washington Capitals
Doug Gilmour – St. Louis Blues
Wayne Gretzky (C) – Edmonton Oilers
Michel Goulet – Quebec Nordiques
Craig Hartsburg – Minnesota North Stars
Dale Hawerchuk (A) – Winnipeg Jets
Ron Hextall – Philadelphia Flyers
Kelly Hrudey – New York Islanders
Claude Lemieux – Montreal Canadiens
Mario Lemieux – Pittsburgh Penguins
Mark Messier (A) – Edmonton Oilers
Larry Murphy – Washington Capitals
James Patrick – New York Rangers
Brian Propp – Philadelphia Flyers
Normand Rochefort – Quebec Nordiques
Brent Sutter – New York Islanders
Rick Tocchet – Philadelphia Flyers

1987 Men's World Ice Hockey Championship
Head coach: Dave King
Keith Acton
Brian Bellows
Doug Bodger
Sean Burke
Dino Ciccarelli
Kevin Dineen
Bruce Driver
Mike Foligno (C)
Bob Froese
Dirk Graham
Craig Hartsburg
Kirk Muller
Larry Murphy
Troy Murray
Barry Pederson
James Patrick
Dan Quinn
Paul Reinhart
Pat Riggin
Bob Rouse
Al Secord
Scott Stevens
Tony Tanti
Zarley Zalapski

1986 Men's World Ice Hockey Championship
Head coach: Pat Quinn
Greg Adams
Dave Andreychuk
Mike Bullard
Jacques Cloutier
Paul Cyr
Ken Daneyko
Marcel Dionne (C)
Mike Foligno
Jim Fox
Mark Hardy
Dale Hawerchuk
Kelly Hrudey
Grant Ledyard
Corrado Micalef
Kirk Muller
Denis Potvin
Craig Redmond
Phil Russell
Brent Sutter
Phil Sykes
Tony Tanti
Dave Taylor
Jay Wells

1985 Men's World Ice Hockey Championship
Head coach: Doug Carpenter
John Anderson
Kevin Dineen
Ron Francis
Doug Halward
Steve Konroyd
Grant Ledyard
Mario Lemieux
Doug Lidster
Brian MacLellan
Jamie Macoun
Don Maloney
Kirk Muller
Larry Murphy
Bernie Nicholls
Pat Riggin
Stan Smyl
Scott Stevens
Tony Tanti
Dave Taylor (C)
Rick Vaive
Rick Wamsley
Steve Weeks
Ian Wood
Steve Yzerman

1984 Canada Cup

Head coach: Glen Sather
Glenn Anderson – Edmonton Oilers
Brian Bellows – Minnesota North Stars
Mike Bossy – New York Islanders
Bob Bourne – New York Islanders
Raymond Bourque – Boston Bruins
Paul Coffey – Edmonton Oilers
Grant Fuhr – Edmonton Oilers
Mike Gartner – Washington Capitals
Michel Goulet – Quebec Nordiques
Randy Gregg – Edmonton Oilers
Wayne Gretzky (C) – Edmonton Oilers
Charlie Huddy – Edmonton Oilers
Réjean Lemelin – Calgary Flames
Kevin Lowe – Edmonton Oilers
Mark Messier – Edmonton Oilers
Rick Middleton – Boston Bruins
Pete Peeters – Boston Bruins
Larry Robinson (C) – Montreal Canadiens
Peter Šťastný – Quebec Nordiques
Brent Sutter – New York Islanders
John Tonelli – New York Islanders
Doug Wilson – Chicago Blackhawks
Steve Yzerman – Detroit Red Wings

1984 Winter Olympics
Head coach: Dave King
Warren Anderson
Robin Bartel
Russ Courtnall
J. J. Daigneault
Kevin Dineen
Dave Donnelly
Bruce Driver
Darren Eliot
Patrick Flatley
Dave Gagner
Mario Gosselin
Vaughn Karpan
Doug Lidster
Darren Lowe
Kirk Muller
James Patrick
Craig Redmond
Dave Tippett (C)
Carey Wilson
Dan Wood

1983 Men's World Ice Hockey Championship
Head coach: Dave King
John Anderson
Marcel Dionne (C)
Brian Engblom
Patrick Flatley
Bob Gainey
Mike Gartner
Michel Goulet
Doug Halward
Craig Hartsburg
Rick Lanz
Dennis Maruk
James Patrick
Brian Propp
Paul Reinhart
Gord Sherven
Charlie Simmer
Darryl Sittler (C)
Scott Stevens
Dave Taylor
Mike Veisor
Rick Wamsley
Tim Watters
Carey Wilson

1982 Men's World Ice Hockey Championship
Head coach: Dave King
Bill Barber (C)
Dino Ciccarelli
Bobby Clarke (C)
Bob Gainey
Mike Gartner
Curt Giles
Rick Green
Wayne Gretzky
Craig Hartsburg
Dale Hawerchuk
Kevin Lowe
Brad Maxwell
Gilles Meloche
Greg Millen
Mark Napier
Brian Propp
Paul Reinhart
Darryl Sittler
Bobby Smith
Rick Vaive
John Van Boxmeer
Ryan Walter

1981 Canada Cup
Head coach: Scotty Bowman
Barry Beck – New York Rangers
Mike Bossy – New York Islanders
Raymond Bourque – Boston Bruins
Marcel Dionne – Los Angeles Kings
Ron Duguay – New York Rangers
Don Edwards – Buffalo Sabres
Brian Engblom – Montreal Canadiens
Bob Gainey – Montreal Canadiens
Danny Gare – Detroit Red Wings
Clark Gillies – New York Islanders
Butch Goring – New York Islanders
Wayne Gretzky – Edmonton Oilers
Craig Hartsburg – Minnesota North Stars
Guy Lafleur – Montreal Canadiens
Ken Linseman – Philadelphia Flyers
Mike Liut – St. Louis Blues
Rick Middleton – Boston Bruins
Gilbert Perreault – Buffalo Sabres
Denis Potvin (C) – New York Islanders
Paul Reinhart – Calgary Flames
Larry Robinson – Montreal Canadiens
Billy Smith – New York Islanders
Bryan Trottier – New York Islanders

1981 Men's World Ice Hockey Championship
Head coach: Don Cherry
Dave Babych
Norm Barnes
Pat Boutette
Lucien Deblois
Mike Foligno
John Garrett
Mike Gartner
Rick Green
Willie Huber
Guy Lafleur
Barry Long
Morris Lukowich
Dennis Maruk
Dale McCourt
Lanny McDonald (C)
Phil Myre
John Ogrodnick
Rob Ramage
Larry Robinson
Mike Rogers
Steve Tambellini
Ryan Walter

1980 Winter Olympics
Head coaches: Lorne Davis, Clare Drake, Tom Watt
Glenn Anderson
Warren Anderson
Dan D'Alvise
Ken Berry
Ronald Davidson
John Devaney
Bob Dupuis
Joe Grant
Randy Gregg (C)
Dave Hindmarch
Paul MacLean
Kevin Maxwell
Jim Nill
Terry O'Malley
Paul Pageau
Brad Pirie
Kevin Primeau
Donald Spring
Tim Watters
Stellio Zupancich

1979 Men's World Ice Hockey Championship
Head coach: Marshall Johnston
Wayne Babych
Guy Charron (C)
Marcel Dionne
Rick Green
Trevor Johansen
Nick Libett
Al MacAdam
Brad Marsh
Dennis Maruk
Brad Maxwell
Dale McCourt
Wilf Paiement
Steve Payne
Robert Picard
Jim Rutherford
David Shand
Bobby Smith
Greg Smith
Ed Staniowski
Garry Unger
Ryan Walter
Paul Woods

1978 Men's World Ice Hockey Championship
Head coach: Harry Howell
Dan Bouchard
Guy Charron
Marcel Dionne (C)
Rick Hampton
Denis Herron
Pat Hickey
Dennis Kearns
Don Lever
Tom Lysiak
Bob MacMillan
Dennis Maruk
Brad Maxwell
Mike Murphy
Wilf Paiement
Robert Picard
Jean Pronovost
Pat Ribble
David Shand
Glen Sharpley
Garry Unger

1977 Men's World Ice Hockey Championship
Head coach: Johnny Wilson
Guy Charron
Ron Ellis
Phil Esposito (C)
Tony Esposito
Rod Gilbert
Rick Hampton
Dennis Kearns
Ralph Klassen
Pierre Larouche
Al MacAdam
Wayne Merrick
Walt McKechnie
Wilf Paiement
Jean Pronovost
Phil Russell
Jim Rutherford
Greg Smith
Dallas Smith
Carol Vadnais
Eric Vail

1976 Canada Cup

Head coach: Scotty Bowman
Assistant Coach: Don Cherry
Bill Barber – Philadelphia Flyers
Gerry Cheevers – Boston Bruins
Bobby Clarke (C) – Philadelphia Flyers
Marcel Dionne – Los Angeles Kings
Phil Esposito – New York Rangers
Bob Gainey – Montreal Canadiens
Danny Gare – Buffalo Sabres
Bobby Hull – Winnipeg Jets
Guy Lafleur – Montreal Canadiens
Guy Lapointe – Montreal Canadiens
Reggie Leach – Philadelphia Flyers
Peter Mahovlich – Montreal Canadiens
Richard Martin – Buffalo Sabres
Lanny McDonald – Toronto Maple Leafs
Bobby Orr – Chicago Blackhawks
Gilbert Perreault – Buffalo Sabres
Denis Potvin – New York Islanders
Glenn Resch – New York Islanders
Larry Robinson – Montreal Canadiens
Serge Savard – Montreal Canadiens
Steve Shutt – Montreal Canadiens
Darryl Sittler – Toronto Maple Leafs
Rogatien Vachon – Los Angeles Kings
Carol Vadnais – New York Rangers
Jimmy Watson – Philadelphia Flyers

1974 Summit Series
Head coach: Billy Harris
Ralph Backstrom – Chicago Cougars
Serge Bernier – Quebec Nordiques
Gerry Cheevers – Cleveland Crusaders
Al Hamilton – Edmonton Oilers
Jim Harrison – Edmonton Oilers
Paul Henderson – Toronto Toros
Réjean Houle – Quebec Nordiques
Gordie Howe – Houston Aeros
Mark Howe – Houston Aeros
Marty Howe – Houston Aeros
Bobby Hull – Winnipeg Jets
André Lacroix – Jersey Knights
Rick Ley – New England Whalers
Frank Mahovlich – Toronto Toros
Bruce MacGregor – Edmonton Oilers
John McKenzie – Vancouver Blazers
Don McLeod – Vancouver Blazers
Brad Selwood – New England Whalers
Paul Shmyr – Cleveland Crusaders
Rick Smith – Minnesota Fighting Saints
Pat Stapleton (C) – Chicago Cougars
Marc Tardif – Quebec Nordiques
J. C. Tremblay – Quebec Nordiques
Mike Walton – Minnesota Fighting Saints
Tom Webster – New England Whalers

1972 Summit Series
Head coach: Harry Sinden
Assistant coach: John Ferguson
Don Awrey – New York Rangers
Red Berenson – St. Louis Blues
Gary Bergman – Detroit Red Wings
Wayne Cashman – Boston Bruins
Bobby Clarke – Philadelphia Flyers
Yvan Cournoyer – Montreal Canadiens
Ken Dryden – Montreal Canadiens
Marcel Dionne – Detroit Red Wings
Ron Ellis – Toronto Maple Leafs
Phil Esposito – Boston Bruins
Tony Esposito – Chicago Blackhawks
Rod Gilbert – New York Rangers
Bill Goldsworthy – Minnesota North Stars
Jocelyn Guevremont – Vancouver Canucks
Vic Hadfield – New York Rangers
Paul Henderson – Toronto Maple Leafs
Dennis Hull – Chicago Blackhawks
Eddie Johnston – Boston Bruins
Guy Lapointe – Montreal Canadiens
Frank Mahovlich – Montreal Canadiens
Peter Mahovlich – Montreal Canadiens
Rick Martin – Buffalo Sabres
Stan Mikita – Chicago Blackhawks
J. P. Parise – Minnesota North Stars
Brad Park – New York Rangers
Gilbert Perreault – Buffalo Sabres
Jean Ratelle – New York Rangers
Mickey Redmond – Detroit Red Wings
Serge Savard – Montreal Canadiens
Rod Seiling – New York Rangers
Pat Stapleton – Chicago Blackhawks
Dale Tallon – Vancouver Canucks
Bill White – Chicago Blackhawks

1969 World Ice Hockey Championship
Head coach: Jackie McLeod
Richie Bayes
Gary Begg
Roger Bourbonnais
Jack Bownass
Terry Caffery
Ab DeMarco
Ken Dryden
Ted Hargreaves
Bill Heindl
Fran Huck
Steve King
Chuck Lefley
Morris Mott
Bob Murdoch
Kevin O'Shea
Terry O'Malley
Gerry Pinder
Steve Rexe
Ken Stephanson
Wayne Stephenson

1968 Winter Olympics
Head coach: Jackie McLeod
Roger Bourbonnais
Ken Broderick
Ray Cadieux
Paul Conlin
Gary Dineen
Brian Glennie
Ted Hargreaves
Fran Huck
Marshall Johnston (C)
Barry MacKenzie
Bill MacMillan
Steve Monteith
Morris Mott
Terry O'Malley
Danny O'Shea
Gerry Pinder
Herb Pinder
Wayne Stephenson

1967 World Ice Hockey Championship
Head coach: Jackie McLeod
Gary Begg
Roger Bourbonnais (C)
Jack Bownass
Carl Brewer
Ray Cadieux
Paul Conlin
Jean Cusson
Gary Dineen
Ted Hargreaves
Fran Huck
Marshall Johnston
Barry MacKenzie
Billy MacMillan
Seth Martin
Morris Mott
Terry O'Malley
Danny O'Shea
Addie Tambellini
Wayne Stephenson

1966 World Ice Hockey Championship
Head coach: Jackie McLeod
Gary Begg
Roger Bourbonnais
Ken Broderick
Ray Cadieux
Paul Conlin
Lorne Davis
George Faulkner
Fran Huck
Marshall Johnston
Jackie McLeod
Barry MacKenzie
Billy MacMillan
Seth Martin
Rick McCann
Morris Mott
Terry O'Malley (C)
Harvey Schmidt

1965 World Ice Hockey Championship
Head coach: Gordon Simpson
Reg Abbott
Gary Aldcorn
Gary Begg
Roger Bourbonnais
Ken Broderick
Don Collins
Brian Conacher
Paul Conlin
Fred Dunsmore
Gary Dineen
Don Fletcher
Bob Forhan
Al Johnson
Bill Johnson
Barry MacKenzie
Jim MacKenzie
Seth Martin
Grant Moore
Terry O'Malley

1964 Winter Olympics
Head coach: David Bauer
Hank Akervall (C)
Gary Begg
Roger Bourbonnais
Ken Broderick
Ray Cadieux
Terry Clancy
Brian Conacher
Paul Conlin
Gary Dineen
Bob Forhan
Marshall Johnston
Seth Martin
Barry MacKenzie
Terry O'Malley
Rod Seiling
George Swarbrick
John (Jack) Wilson - alternate

1963 World Ice Hockey Championship
Trail Smoke Eaters

Head coach: Bobby Kromm
George Ferguson
Don Fletcher
Bob Forhan
Howie Hornby
Harold Jones
Norm Lenardon
Ted Maki
Seth Martin
Pinoke McIntyre
Bob McKnight
Jackie McLeod
Walt Peacosh
Gerry Penner
Howie Penner
Ed Pollesol
Harry Smith
Addie Tambellini

1962 World Ice Hockey Championship
Galt Terriers

Head coach: Lloyd Roubell
Bobby Brown
Al Cullen
Jack Douglas
Joe Hogan
Harold Hurley
Alec Keeling
Ted Maki
Joe Malo
Bob Mader
Floyd Martin
Bob McKnight
Jackie McLeod
Bill Mitchell
Bobby Robertson
Donald Rope
Tod Sloan
John Sofiak
Harry Smith
Bill Wylie

1961 World Ice Hockey Championship
Trail Smoke Eaters

Head coach: Bobby Kromm
Ed Christofoli
Claude Cyr
George Ferguson
Don Fletcher
Cal Hockley
Hal Jones
Bobby Kromm
Mike Lagace
Norm Lenardon
Seth Martin
Pinoke McIntyre
Jackie McLeod
Walt Peacosh
Gerry Penner
Dave Rusnell
Darryl Sly
Harry Smith
Addie Tambellini

1960 Winter Olympics
Kitchener–Waterloo Dutchmen

Head coach: Bobby Bauer
Bob Attersley
Maurice Benoît
Jim Connelly
Jack Douglas
Fred Etcher
Bob Forhan
Don Head
Harold Hurley
Ken Laufman
Floyd Martin
Bob McKnight
Cliff Pennington
Donald Rope
Bobby Rousseau
George Samolenko
Harry Sinden (C)
Darryl Sly

1959 World Ice Hockey Championship
Belleville McFarlands

Head coach: Ike Hildebrand
Red Berenson
Bart Bradley
Wayne Brown
Pete Conacher
Floyd Crawford
Gordon Bell
Maurice Benoît
Denis Boucher
Al Dewsbury
Marv Edwards
Fiori Goegan
George Gosselin
Ike Hildebrand
Dave Jones
Jean–Paul Lamirande
John McLellan
Paul Payette
Lou Smrke

1958 World Ice Hockey Championship
Whitby Dunlops

Head coach: Sid Smith
Sandy Air
Bob Attersley
Frank Bonello
Connie Broden
Roy Edwards
Fred Etcher
Bus Gagnon
George Gosselin
John Henderson
Jean–Paul Lamirande
Don McBeth
Gord Myles
Ted O'Connor
Ed Redmond
George Santolenko
Harry Sinden (C)
Sid Smith
Alf Treen

1956 Winter Olympics
Kitchener–Waterloo Dutchmen

Head coach: Bobby Bauer
Denis Brodeur
Charlie Brooker
Bill Colvin
Alfred Horne
Art Hurst
Byrle Klinck
Paul Knox
Ken Laufman
Howie Lee
Jim Logan
Floyd Martin
Jack McKenzie (C)
Donald Rope
George Scholes
Gerry Theberge
Bob White
Keith Woodall

1955 World Ice Hockey Championship
Penticton V's

Head coach: Grant Warwick
Bernie Bathgate
Don Berry
Jim Fairburn
Ed Kassian
Doug Kilburn
Kevin Conway
Dino Mascotto
George McAvoy (C)
Jack McDonald
Jack McIntyre
Ivan McLelland
Jim Middleton
Don Moog
Erine Rucks
Mike Shebaga
Jack Taggart
Hal Tarala
Bill Warwick
Dick Warwick
Grant Warwick

1954 World Ice Hockey Championship
East York Lyndhursts

Head coach: Greg Currie
Tom Campbell (C)
Doug Chapman
Earl Clements
Don Couch
Harold Fiskari
Norm Gray
Moe Galand
Tom Jamieson
Larry Kearns
Bob Kennedy
Gavin Lindsay
Don Lockhart
John Petro
Russ Robertson
George Sayliss
John Scott
Bill Shill
Vic Sluce
Reg Spragge
Dan Windley
Eric Unger

1952 Winter Olympics
Edmonton Mercurys

Head coach: Lou Holmes
George Abel
John Davies
Billy Dawe (C)
Robert Dickson
Donald Gauf
William Gibson
Ralph Hansch
Robert Meyers
David Miller
Eric Paterson
Thomas Pollock
Allan Purvis
Gordon Robertson
Louis Secco
Francis Sullivan
Robert Watt

1951 World Ice Hockey Championship
Lethbridge Maple Leafs

Head coach: Dick Gray
Bill Chandler
Dinny Flanagan
Bill Flick
Bill Gibson
Dick Gray
Mallie Hughes
Bert Knibbs
Don McLean
Jim Malacko
Nap Milroy
Hector Negrello (C)
Stan Obodiac
Walter Rimstad
Mickey Roth
Lou Siray
Carl Sorokoski
Don Vogan
Tom Wood

1950 World Ice Hockey Championship
Edmonton Mercurys

Head coach: Jimmy Graham
Harry Allen
Robert David
Billy Dawe
Marsh Darling
John Davies
Wilbur Delaney
Don Gauf
Doug Kilburn
Leo Lucchini
Doug Macauley
Jack Manson
Al Purvis
Don Stanley
Robert Watt
Pete Wright
Hassie Young

1949 World Ice Hockey Championship
Sudbury Wolves

Head coach: Max Silverman
Ray Bauer
Joe de Bastiani
Bill Dimock
Doug Free
Emil Gagne
Bud Hashey
Barney Hillson
Herb Kewley
John Kovich
Don Munroe
Al Picard
Albert Rabelletto
Jim Russell
Tom Russell
Don Stanley
Joe Tergesen

1948 Winter Olympics
Ottawa RCAF Flyers

Head coach: Frank Boucher (nephew of Frank Boucher)
George McFaul (trainer)
Sandy Watson (manager)
Hubert Brooks (reserve)
Murray Dowey, (goaltender)
Frank Dunster, (defenceman)
Roy Forbes, (defenceman)
Andy Gilpin, (forward) (reserve)
Jean Gravelle
Patsy Guzzo
Wally Halder
Ted Hibberd
Ross King, (goaltender) (reserve)
Henri–André Laperrière, (defenceman)
John Lecompte, (defenceman)
Pete Leichnitz (reserve)
George Mara
Albert Renaud
Reginald Schroeter
Irving Taylor

1939 World Ice Hockey Championship
Trail Smoke Eaters

Head coach: Elmer Piper
Mickey Brennen
Buck Buchanan
Ab Cronie
Bunny Dame
Jim Haight
Benny Hayes
Dick Kowcinak
Tom Johnston
John McCreedy
Jim Morris
Duke Scodellaro
Mel Snowdon

1938 World Ice Hockey Championship
Sudbury Wolves

Head coach: Max Silverman
Mel Albright
Percy Allen
Gordie Bruce
Archie Burn
Reg Chipman
John Coulter
Johnny Godfrey
Roy Heximer
Jack Marshall
Pat McReavy
Buster Portland
Jim Russell
Glen Sutherland

1937 World Ice Hockey Championship
Kimberley Dynamiters

Head coach: John Achtzener
Tom Almack
Fred Botterill
Fred Burnett
Ken Campbell
George Goble
Eric Hornquist
Doug Keiver
James Kemp
Paul Kozak
Hugo Mackie
Ralph Reading
Harry Robertson
George Wilson

1936 Winter Olympics
Port Arthur Bearcats

Head coach: Al Pudas
Maxwell Deacon
Hugh Farquharson
Kenneth Farmer
James Haggarty
Walter Kitchen
Raymond Milton
Francis Moore
Herman Murray (C)
Arthur Nash
David Neville
Alexander Sinclair
Ralph St. Germain
Bill Thomson

1935 World Ice Hockey Championship
Winnipeg Monarchs

Head coach: Scotty Oliver
Archie Creighton
Roy Henkel
Albert Lemay
Tony Lemay
Vic Lindquist
Art Rice–Jones
Romeo Rivers
Cam Shewan
Norm Yellowlees

1934 World Ice Hockey Championship
Saskatoon Quakers

Head coach: Johnny Walker
Les Bird
Tommy Dewar
Jim Dewey
Cliff Lake
Elmer Piper
Ab Rogers
Bert Scharfe
Ron Silver
Ray Watkins
Ab Welsh
Cooney Woods
Hobb Wilson

1933 World Ice Hockey Championship
Toronto National Sea Fleas

Head coach: Harold Ballard
Cliff Chisholm
Frank Collins
John Hern
Kenny Kane
Norm Lamport
Doug Lough
Clare McIntyre
Jimmy McMullen
Stuffy Mueller

1932 Winter Olympics
Winnipeg Hockey Club

Head coach: Jack Hughes
William Cockburn (C)
Clifford Crowley
Albert Duncanson
George Garbutt
Roy Henkel
Victor Lindquist
Norman Malloy
Walter Monson
Kenneth Moore
Romeo Rivers
Hack Simpson
Hugh Sutherland
Stanley Wagner
Alston Wise

1931 World Ice Hockey Championship
University of Manitoba Grads

Head coach: Blake Watson
George Hill
Gord MacKenzie (C)
Sammy McCallum
Ward McVey
Frank Morris
Jack Pidcock
Art Puttee
Blake Watson
Guy Williamson

1930 World Ice Hockey Championship
Toronto CCMs

Head coach: Les Allen
Willie Adams
Howard Armstrong (C)
Bert Clayton
Joe Griffen
Gordon Grant
Alex Park
Fred Radke
Percy Timpson

1928 Winter Olympics
University of Toronto Grads

Head coach: Conn Smythe
Charles Delahaye
Frank Fisher
Louis Hudson
Norbert Mueller
Herbert Plaxton
Hugh Plaxton
Roger Plaxton
John Porter (C)
Frank Sullivan
Joseph Sullivan
Ross Taylor
Dave Trottier

1924 Winter Olympics
Toronto Granites

Head coach: Frank Rankin
Jack Cameron
Ernie Collett
Bert McCaffrey
Harold McMunn
Dunc Munro (C)
Beattie Ramsay
Cyril Slater
Reginald Smith
Harry Watson

1920 Summer Olympics
Winnipeg Falcons

Head coach: Gordon Sigurjonsson

Goaltender
Walter Byron
Defence
Robert Benson
Konrad Johannesson
Forward
Frank Fredrickson – C
Chris Fridfinnson
Magnus Goodman
Haldor Halderson
Allan Woodman

Women's

Junior

2023 World Junior Ice Hockey Championship
Head coach
Dennis Williams

Goaltender
Benjamin Gaudreau - Sarnia Sting
Thomas Milic - Seattle Thunderbirds
Defence
Nolan Allan - Seattle Thunderbirds
Brandt Clarke - Los Angeles Kings
Ethan Del Mastro - Mississauga Steelheads
Tyson Hinds - Sherbrooke Phoenix
Kevin Korchinski - Seattle Thunderbirds
Jack Matier - Ottawa 67’s
Olen Zellweger - Everett Silvertips
Forward
Caedan Bankier - Kamloops Blazers
Owen Beck - Mississauga Steelheads
Connor Bedard - Regina Pats
Colton Dach - Kelowna Rockets
Zach Dean - Gatineau Olympiques
Adam Fantilli - University of Michigan
Nathan Gaucher - Quebec Remparts
Dylan Guenther - Arizona Coyotes
Zack Ostapchuk - Vancouver Giants
Brennan Othmann - Peterborough Petes
Joshua Roy - Sherbrooke Phoenix
Reid Schaefer - Seattle Thunderbirds
Logan Stankoven - Kamloops Blazers
Shane Wright - Seattle Kraken

2022 World Junior Ice Hockey Championship summer edition
Head coach
Dave Cameron

Goaltender
Brett Brochu - London Knights
Sebastian Cossa - Edmonton Oil Kings
Dylan Garand - Kamloops Blazers
Defence
Lukas Cormier - Charlottetown Islanders
Ethan Del Mastro - Mississauga Steelheads
Carson Lambos - Winnipeg Ice
Ryan O'Rourke - Sault Ste. Marie Greyhounds
Donovan Sebrango - Grand Rapids Griffins
Ronan Seeley - Everett Silvertips
Jack Thompson - Sault Ste. Marie Greyhounds
Olen Zellweger - Everett Silvertips
Forward
Connor Bedard - Regina Pats
Will Cuylle - Windsor Spitfires
Elliot Desnoyers - Halifax Mooseheads
William Dufour - Saint John Sea Dogs
Tyson Foerster - Barrie Colts
Nathan Gaucher - Quebec Remparts
Ridly Greig - Brandon Wheat Kings
Kent Johnson - Columbus Blue Jackets
Riley Kidney - Acadie-Bathurst Titan
Mason McTavish - Hamilton Bulldogs
Zack Ostapchuk - Vancouver Giants
Brennan Othmann - Flint Firebirds
Joshua Roy - Sherbrooke Phoenix
Logan Stankoven - Kamloops Blazers

2022 World Junior Ice Hockey Championship winter edition
Head coach
Dave Cameron

Goaltender
Brett Brochu - London Knights
Sebastian Cossa - Edmonton Oil Kings
Dylan Garand - Kamloops Blazers
Defence
Lukas Cormier - Charlottetown Islanders
Kaiden Guhle - Edmonton Oil Kings
Carson Lambos - Winnipeg Ice
Ryan O'Rourke - Sault Ste. Marie Greyhounds
Owen Power - University of Michigan
Donovan Sebrango - Grand Rapids Griffins
Ronan Seeley - Everett Silvertips
Olen Zellweger - Everett Silvertips
Forward
Connor Bedard - Regina Pats
Xavier Bourgault - Shawinigan Cataractes
Mavrik Bourque - Shawinigan Cataractes
Will Cuylle - Windsor Spitfires
Elliot Desnoyers - Halifax Mooseheads
Ridly Greig - Brandon Wheat Kings
Dylan Guenther - Edmonton Oil Kings
Kent Johnson - University of Michigan
Mason McTavish - Peterborough Petes
Jake Neighbours - Edmonton Oil Kings
Cole Perfetti - Manitoba Moose
Logan Stankoven - Kamloops Blazers
Justin Sourdif - Vancouver Giants
Shane Wright - Kingston Frontenacs

2021 World Junior Ice Hockey Championship
Head coach
André Tourigny

Goaltender
Dylan Garand - Kamloops Blazers
Taylor Gauthier - Prince George Cougars
Devon Levi - Northeastern University
Defence
Justin Barron - Halifax Mooseheads
Bowen Byram - Vancouver Giants (A)
Jamie Drysdale - Erie Otters
Kaiden Guhle - Prince Albert Raiders
Thomas Harley - Mississauga Steelheads
Kaedan Korczak - Kelowna Rockets
Braden Schneider - Brandon Wheat Kings
Jordan Spence - Moncton Wildcats
Forward
Quinton Byfield - Sudbury Wolves
Dylan Cozens - Lethbridge Hurricanes (A)
Kirby Dach - Chicago Blackhawks (C)
Dylan Holloway - University of Wisconsin
Peyton Krebs - Winnipeg Ice
Connor McMichael - London Knights
Dawson Mercer - Chicoutimi Sagueneens
Alex Newhook - Boston College
Jakob Pelletier - Val-d'Or Foreurs
Cole Perfetti - Saginaw Spirit
Jack Quinn - Ottawa 67’s
Ryan Suzuki - Saginaw Spirit
Philip Tomasino - Oshawa Generals
Connor Zary - Kamloops Blazers

2020 World Junior Ice Hockey Championship
Head coach
Dale Hunter

Goaltender
Nico Daws - Guelph Storm
Joel Hofer - Portland Winterhawks
Olivier Rodrigue - Moncton Wildcats
Defence
Calen Addison - Lethbridge Hurricanes
Kevin Bahl - Ottawa 67's
Jacob Bernard-Docker - University of North Dakota
Bowen Byram - Vancouver Giants
Jamie Drysdale - Erie Otters
Jared McIsaac - Halifax Mooseheads
Ty Smith (ice hockey) - Spokane Chiefs
Forward
Quinton Byfield - Sudbury Wolves
Dylan Cozens - Lethbridge Hurricanes
Ty Dellandrea - Flint Firebirds
Aidan Dudas - Owen Sound
Nolan Foote - Kelowna Rockets
Liam Foudy - London Knights
Barrett Hayton - Arizona Coyotes
Alexis Lafrenière - Rimouski Oceanic
Raphaël Lavoie - Halifax Mooseheads
Connor McMichael - London Knights
Dawson Mercer - Drummondville Voltigeurs
Akil Thomas - Niagara IceDogs
Joe Veleno - Grand Rapids Griffins

2019 World Junior Ice Hockey Championship
Head coach
Tim Hunter (ice hockey)

Goaltender
Michael DiPietro - Ottawa 67's
Ian Scott - Prince Albert Raiders
Defence
Evan Bouchard (A) - London Knights
Josh Brook - Moose Jaw Warriors
Noah Dobson - Acadie-Bathurst Titan
Jared McIsaac - Halifax Mooseheads
Ian Mitchell (A) - University of Denver
Markus Phillips - Owen Sound Attack
Ty Smith (ice hockey) - Spokane Chiefs
Forward
Jaret Anderson-Dolan (A) - Spokane Chiefs
Shane Bowers - Boston University Terriers
Max Comtois (C) - Drummondville Voltigeurs
MacKenzie Entwistle - Hamilton Bulldogs
Morgan Frost - Sault Ste. Marie Greyhounds
Cody Glass - Portland Winterhawks
Barrett Hayton - Sault Ste. Marie Greyhounds
Alexis Lafrenière - Rimouski Oceanic
Brett Leason - Prince Albert Raiders
Jack Studnicka - Oshawa Generals
Nick Suzuki - Owen Sound Attack
Owen Tippett - Mississauga Steelheads
Joe Veleno - Drummondville Voltigeurs

2018 World Junior Ice Hockey Championship
Head coach
Dominique Ducharme (ice hockey)

Goaltender
Carter Hart - Philadelphia Flyers
Colton Point - Colgate University Raiders
Defence
Jake Bean - Calgary Hitmen
Conor Timmins - Sault Ste. Marie Greyhounds
Cal Foote - Kelowna Rockets
Cale Makar - UMass Minutemen
Dante Fabbro (A) - Boston University Terriers
Kale Clague (A) - Brandon Wheat Kings
Victor Mete (A) - Montreal Canadiens
Forward
Dillon Dubé (C) - Kelowna Rockets
Boris Katchouk - Sault Ste. Marie Greyhounds
Max Comtois - Victoriaville Tigres
Taylor Raddysh - Erie Otters
Tyler Steenbergen - Swift Current Broncos
Drake Batherson - Cape Breton Screaming Eagles
Michael McLeod - Mississauga Steelheads
Brett Howden - Moose Jaw Warriors
Sam Steel - Regina Pats
Alex Formenton - London Knights
Jordan Kyrou - Sarnia Sting
Robert Thomas - London Knights
Jonah Gadjovich - Owen Sound Attack

2017 World Junior Ice Hockey Championship
Head coach
Dominique Ducharme (ice hockey)

Goaltender
Carter Hart - Everett Silvertips
Connor Ingram - Kamloops Blazers
Defence
Jake Bean - Calgary Hitmen
Noah Juulsen - Everett Silvertips
Thomas Chabot (A) - Saint John Sea Dogs
Philippe Myers - Rouyn-Noranda Huskies
Dante Fabbro - Boston University Terriers
Kale Clague - Brandon Wheat Kings
Jérémy Lauzon - Rouyn-Noranda Huskies
Forward
Dillon Dubé - Kelowna Rockets
Mathieu Joseph - Saint John Sea Dogs
Julien Gauthier - Val-d'Or Foreurs
Mathew Barzal (A) - Seattle Thunderbirds
Nicolas Roy - Chicoutimi Saguenéens
Taylor Raddysh - Erie Otters
Tyson Jost - University of North Dakota Fighting Hawks
Pierre-Luc Dubois - Cape Breton Screaming Eagles
Dylan Strome (C) - Erie Otters
Michael McLeod - Mississauga Steelheads
Blake Speers - Sault Ste. Marie Greyhounds
Anthony Cirelli - Oshawa Generals
Mitchell Stephens - Saginaw Spirit

2016 World Junior Ice Hockey Championship
Head coach
Dave Lowry

Goaltender
Mason McDonald – Charlottetown Islanders
Mackenzie Blackwood – Barrie Colts
Samuel Montembeault – Blainville–Boisbriand Armada
Defence
Joe Hicketts (A) – Victoria Royals
Haydn Fleury – Red Deer Rebels
Thomas Chabot – Saint John Sea Dogs
Brandon Hickey – Boston University
Roland McKeown – Kingston Frontenacs
Travis Sanheim – Calgary Hitmen
Travis Dermott – Erie Otters

Forward
Dylan Strome – Erie Otters
Brendan Perlini – Niagara IceDogs
Julien Gauthier – Val–d'Or Foreurs
Mathew Barzal – Seattle Thunderbirds
Rourke Chartier – Kelowna Rockets
Mitch Marner – London Knights
Travis Konecny – Ottawa 67's
Jake Virtanen – Vancouver Canucks
Brayden Point (C) – Moose Jaw Warriors
Anthony Beauvillier – Shawinigan Cataractes
John Quenneville – Brandon Wheat Kings
Mitchell Stephens – Saginaw Spirit
Lawson Crouse (A) – Kingston Frontenacs

2015 World Junior Ice Hockey Championship
Head coach
Benoit Groulx

Goaltender
Eric Comrie – Tri–City Americans
Zachary Fucale – Halifax Mooseheads
Defence
Joe Hicketts – Victoria Royals
Dillon Heatherington – Swift Current Broncos
Madison Bowey – Kelowna Rockets
Samuel Morin – Rimouski Océanic
Shea Theodore – Seattle Thunderbirds
Josh Morrissey – Kelowna Rockets
Darnell Nurse – Sault Ste. Marie Greyhounds

Forward
Brayden Point -- Moose Jaw Warriors
Anthony Duclair – Quebec Remparts
Max Domi – London Knights
Connor McDavid – Erie Otters
Jake Virtanen – Calgary Hitmen
Nic Petan – Portland Winterhawks
Nick Paul – North Bay Battalion
Nick Ritchie – Peterborough Petes
Frédérik Gauthier – Rimouski Océanic
Sam Reinhart – Kootenay Ice
Curtis Lazar – Ottawa Senators
Lawson Crouse – Kingston Frontenacs
Robby Fabbri – Guelph Storm

2014 World Junior Ice Hockey Championship
Head coach
Brent Sutter

Goaltender
Zachary Fucale – Halifax Mooseheads
Jake Paterson – Saginaw Spirit
Defence
Chris Bigras – Owen Sound Attack
Mathew Dumba – Minnesota Wild
Aaron Ekblad – Barrie Colts
Josh Morrissey – Prince Albert Raiders
Adam Pelech – Erie Otters
Derrick Pouliot – Portland Winterhawks
Griffin Reinhart – Edmonton Oil Kings
Forward
Josh Anderson – London Knights
Jonathan Drouin – Halifax Mooseheads
Frédérik Gauthier – Rimouski Océanic
Bo Horvat – London Knights
Charles Hudon – Chicoutimi Saguenéens
Scott Laughton – Oshawa Generals
Curtis Lazar – Edmonton Oil Kings
Taylor Leier – Portland Winterhawks
Anthony Mantha – Val-d'Or Foreurs
Connor McDavid – Erie Otters
Nic Petan – Portland Winterhawks
Sam Reinhart – Kootenay Ice
Kerby Rychel – Guelph Storm

2013 World Junior Ice Hockey Championships
Head coach
Steve Spott

Goaltender
Jordan Binnington – Owen Sound Attack
Jake Paterson – Saginaw Spirit
Malcolm Subban – Belleville Bulls
Defence
Dougie Hamilton – Niagara IceDogs
Scott Harrington (A) – London Knights
Ryan Murphy – Kitchener Rangers
Xavier Ouellet – Blainville-Boisbriand Armada
Griffin Reinhart – Edmonton Oil Kings
Morgan Rielly – Moose Jaw Warriors
Tyler Wotherspoon – Portland Winterhawks
Forward
Anthony Camara – Barrie Colts
Phillip Danault – Victoriaville Tigres
Jonathan Drouin – Halifax Mooseheads
Jonathan Huberdeau (A) – Saint John Sea Dogs
Charles Hudon – Chicoutimi Saguenéens
Boone Jenner – Oshawa Generals
JC Lipon – Kamloops Blazers
Nathan MacKinnon – Halifax Mooseheads
Mark McNeill – Prince Albert Raiders
Ryan Nugent–Hopkins (C) – Oklahoma City Barons
Ty Rattie – Portland Winterhawks
Brett Ritchie – Niagara IceDogs
Mark Scheifele – Barrie Colts
Ryan Strome – Niagara IceDogs

2012 World Junior Ice Hockey Championships
Head coach
Don Hay

Goaltender
Mark Visentin – Niagara IceDogs
Scott Wedgewood – Plymouth Whalers
Defence
Nathan Beaulieu – Saint John Sea Dogs
Brandon Gormley (A) – Moncton Wildcats
Dougie Hamilton – Niagara IceDogs
Scott Harrington – London Knights
Ryan Murray – Everett Silvertips
Jamie Oleksiak – Saginaw Spirit
Mark Pysyk – Edmonton Oil Kings
Forward
Michaël Bournival – Shawinigan Cataractes
Brett Connolly (A) – Tampa Bay Lightning
Brendan Gallagher – Vancouver Giants
Freddie Hamilton – Niagara IceDogs
Quinton Howden (A) – Moose Jaw Warriors
Jonathan Huberdeau – Saint John Sea Dogs
Boone Jenner – Oshawa Generals
Tanner Pearson – Barrie Colts
Mark Scheifele – Barrie Colts
Jaden Schwartz (C) – Colorado College Tigers
Devante Smith–Pelly (A) – Anaheim Ducks
Mark Stone – Brandon Wheat Kings
Ryan Strome – Niagara IceDogs

2011 World Junior Ice Hockey Championships
Head coach
Dave Cameron

Goaltender
Olivier Roy – Acadie-Bathurst Titan
Mark Visentin – Niagara IceDogs
Defence
Tyson Barrie – Kelowna Rockets
Jared Cowen (A) – Spokane Chiefs
Calvin de Haan (A) – Oshawa Generals
Simon Després – Saint John Sea Dogs
Ryan Ellis (C) – Windsor Spitfires
Erik Gudbranson – Kingston Frontenacs
Dylan Olsen – Minnesota–Duluth Bulldogs
Forward
Carter Ashton – Tri–City Americans
Casey Cizikas – Mississauga St. Michael's Majors
Brett Connolly – Prince George Cougars
Sean Couturier – Drummondville Voltigeurs
Cody Eakin – Swift Current Broncos
Marcus Foligno – Sudbury Wolves
Curtis Hamilton – Saskatoon Blades
Quinton Howden – Moose Jaw Warriors
Ryan Johansen – Portland Winterhawks
Zack Kassian – Windsor Spitfires
Louis Leblanc – Montreal Juniors
Brayden Schenn (A) – Brandon Wheat Kings
Jaden Schwartz – Colorado College Tigers

2010 World Junior Ice Hockey Championship
Head coach
Willie Desjardins

Goaltender
Jake Allen – Montreal Juniors
Martin Jones – Calgary Hitmen
Defence
Jared Cowen – Spokane Chiefs
Calvin de Haan – Oshawa Generals
Ryan Ellis (A) – Windsor Spitfires
Travis Hamonic – Moose Jaw Warriors
Alex Pietrangelo (A) – St. Louis Blues
Marco Scandella – Val-d'Or Foreurs
Colten Teubert (A) – Regina Pats
Forward
Luke Adam – Cape Breton Screaming Eagles
Gabriel Bourque – Baie-Comeau Drakkar
Jordan Caron – Rimouski Océanic
Patrice Cormier (C) – Rimouski Océanic
Stefan Della Rovere (A) – Barrie Colts
Jordan Eberle (A) – Regina Pats
Taylor Hall – Windsor Spitfires
Adam Henrique – Windsor Spitfires
Nazem Kadri – London Knights
Brandon Kozun – Calgary Hitmen
Brandon McMillan – Kelowna Rockets
Greg Nemisz – Windsor Spitfires
Brayden Schenn – Brandon Wheat Kings

2009 World Junior Ice Hockey Championship
Head coach
Pat Quinn

Goaltender
Chet Pickard – Tri-City Americans
Dustin Tokarski – Spokane Chiefs
Defence
Keith Aulie – Brandon Wheat Kings
Ryan Ellis – Windsor Spitfires
Cody Goloubef – Wisconsin Badgers
Thomas Hickey (C) – Seattle Thunderbirds
Tyler Myers – Kelowna Rockets
Alex Pietrangelo – Niagara IceDogs
P. K. Subban (A) – Belleville Bulls
Colten Teubert – Regina Pats
Forward
Jamie Benn – Kelowna Rockets
Zach Boychuk (A) – Lethbridge Hurricanes
Patrice Cormier – Rimouski Océanic
Stefan Della Rovere – Barrie Colts
Chris DiDomenico – Drummondville Voltigeurs
Jordan Eberle – Regina Pats
Tyler Ennis – Medicine Hat Tigers
Angelo Esposito – Montreal Juniors
Cody Hodgson (A) – Brampton Battalion
Evander Kane – Vancouver Giants
Brett Sonne – Calgary Hitmen
John Tavares (A) – Oshawa Generals

2008 World Junior Ice Hockey Championship
Head coach
Craig Hartsburg
Assistant coach
Clément Jodoin
Curtis Hunt

Goaltender
Jonathan Bernier – Lewiston Maineiacs
 Steve Mason – London Knights
Defence
Karl Alzner – Calgary Hitmen
Drew Doughty – Guelph Storm
Josh Godfrey – Sault Ste. Marie Greyhounds
Thomas Hickey – Seattle Thunderbirds
Logan Pyett – Regina Pats
Luke Schenn – Kelowna Rockets
P. K. Subban – Belleville Bulls
Forward
Zach Boychuk – Lethbridge Hurricanes
Colton Gillies – Saskatoon Blades
Claude Giroux – Gatineau Olympiques
Matt Halischuk – Kitchener Rangers
Riley Holzapfel – Moose Jaw Warriors
Stefan Legein – Niagara IceDogs
Brad Marchand– Val–d'Or Foreurs
Shawn Matthias – Belleville Bulls
Wayne Simmonds – Owen Sound Attack
Steven Stamkos – Sarnia Sting
Brandon Sutter – Red Deer Rebels
John Tavares – Oshawa Generals
Kyle Turris – Wisconsin Badgers

2007 Super Series
Head coach: Brent Sutter

Goaltender
Jonathan Bernier
Steve Mason
Leland Irving
Defence
Karl Alzner (A)
Drew Doughty
Keaton Ellerby
Thomas Hickey
Logan Pyett
Luke Schenn
Ty Wishart
Forward
Zachary Boychuk
Cory Emmerton
Sam Gagner (A)
Colton Gillies
Claude Giroux
Zach Hamill
Stefan Legein
Milan Lucic (C)
Brad Marchand
David Perron
Brandon Sutter (A)
John Tavares
Kyle Turris
Dana Tyrell

2007 World Junior Ice Hockey Championship
Head coach: Craig Hartsburg

Goaltender
Leland Irving
Carey Price
Defence
Karl Alzner
Luc Bourdon
Cody Franson
Kris Letang
Ryan Parent
Kris Russell
Marc Staal
Forward
Dan Bertram
Marc–André Cliche
Andrew Cogliano
Steve Downie
 Sam Gagner
Darren Helm
Bryan Little
Brad Marchand
Kenndal McArdle
James Neal
Ryan O'Marra
Tom Pyatt
Jonathan Toews

2006 World Junior Ice Hockey Championship

Head coach: Brent Sutter
Goaltender
Devan Dubnyk
Justin Pogge
Defence
Cam Barker
Luc Bourdon
Kris Letang
Ryan Parent
Sasha Pokulok
Kris Russell
Marc Staal
Forward
Dan Bertram
Michael Blunden
David Bolland
Dustin Boyd
Kyle Chipchura
Andrew Cogliano
Blake Comeau
Steve Downie
Guillaume Latendresse
Ryan O'Marra
Benoît Pouliot
Tom Pyatt
Jonathan Toews

2005 World Junior Ice Hockey Championship

Head coach: Brent Sutter
Goaltender
Rejean Beauchemin
Jeff Glass
Defence
Cam Barker
Shawn Belle
Braydon Coburn
Dion Phaneuf
Brent Seabrook
Danny Syvret
Shea Weber
Forward
Patrice Bergeron
Jeff Carter
Jeremy Colliton
Sidney Crosby
Nigel Dawes
Stephen Dixon
Colin Fraser
Ryan Getzlaf
Andrew Ladd
Clarke MacArthur
Corey Perry
Mike Richards
Anthony Stewart

2004 World Junior Ice Hockey Championship

Head coach: Mario Durocher
Goaltender
Marc–André Fleury
Josh Harding
Defence
Derek Meech
Dion Phaneuf
Josh Gorges
Kevin Klein
Braydon Coburn
Brent Seabrook
Shawn Belle
Forward
Tim Brent
Jeff Carter
Anthony Stewart
Ryan Getzlaf
Daniel Paille
Mike Richards
Jeff Tambellini
Jeremy Colliton
Brent Burns
Stephen Dixon
Maxime Talbot
Nigel Dawes
Sidney Crosby

2003 World Junior Ice Hockey Championship

Head coach: Marc Habscheid
Goaltender
Marc–André Fleury
David LeNeveu
Defence
Brendan Bell
Carlo Colaiacovo
Steve Eminger
Alexandre Rouleau
Nathan Paetsch
Ian White
Jeff Woywitka
Forward
Pierre–Marc Bouchard
Gregory Campbell
Boyd Gordon
Brooks Laich
Joffrey Lupul
Jay McClement
Daniel Paille
P. A. Parenteau
Derek Roy
Matt Stajan
Jordin Tootoo
Scottie Upshall
Kyle Wellwood

2002 World Junior Ice Hockey Championship

Head coach: Stan Butler
Goaltender
Pascal Leclaire
Olivier Michaud
Defence
Jay Bouwmeester
Carlo Colaiacovo
Dan Hamhuis
Jay Harrison
Nathan Paetsch
Mark Popovic
Nick Schultz
Forward
Jared Aulin
Brad Boyes
Mike Cammalleri
Chuck Kobasew
Jay McClement
Garth Murray
Rick Nash
Steve Ott
Jason Spezza
Jarret Stoll
Brian Sutherby
Scottie Upshall
Stephen Weiss

2001 World Junior Ice Hockey Championship

Head coach: Stan Butler
Goaltender
Alex Auld
Maxime Ouellet
Defence
Jay Bouwmeester
Dan Hamhuis
Jay Harrison
Barrett Jackman
Steve McCarthy
Mark Popovic
Nick Schultz
Forward
Brad Boyes
Michael Cammalleri
Dany Heatley
Jason Jaspers
Jamie Lundmark
Derek MacKenzie
David Morisset
Steve Ott
Brandon Reid
Jason Spezza
Jarret Stoll
Raffi Torres
Michael Zigomanis

2000 World Junior Ice Hockey Championship

Head coach: Claude Julien
Goaltender
Brian Finley
Maxime Ouellet
Defence
Mathieu Biron
Jay Bouwmeester
Barrett Jackman
Matt Kinch
Steve McCarthy
Kyle Rossiter
Joe Rullier
Forward
Mark Bell
Tyler Bouck
Eric Chouinard
Dany Heatley
Jamie Lundmark
Manny Malhotra
Chris Nielsen
Matt Pettinger
Brandon Reid
Mike Ribeiro
Brad Richards
Michael Ryder
Jason Spezza

1999 World Junior Ice Hockey Championship

Head coach: Tom Renney
Goaltender
Brian Finley
Roberto Luongo
Defence
Bryan Allen
Brian Campbell
Brad Ference
Andrew Ference
Robyn Regehr
Brad Stuart
Mike Van Ryn
Forward
Blair Betts
Tyler Bouck
Kyle Calder
Jason Chimera
Harold Druken
Rico Fata
Simon Gagné
Brad Leeb
Adam Mair
Kent McDonell
Brenden Morrow
Daniel Tkaczuk
Jason Ward

1998 World Junior Ice Hockey Championship

Head coach: Real Paiement
Goaltender
Roberto Luongo
Mathieu Garon
Defence
Brad Ference
Eric Brewer
Jesse Wallin
Zenith Komarniski
Sean Blanchard
Cory Sarich
Mike Van Ryn
Forward
Manny Malhotra
Daniel Tkaczuk
Steve Bégin
Matt Cooke
Vincent Lecavalier
Daniel Corso
Brett McLean
J. P. Dumont
Alex Tanguay
Jason Ward
Josh Holden
Brian Willsie
Matt Bradley

1997 World Junior Ice Hockey Championship

Head coach: Mike Babcock
Goaltender
Martin Biron
Marc Denis
Defence
Jason Doig
Hugh Hamilton
Richard Jackman
Chris Phillips
Cory Sarich
Jesse Wallin
Jeff Ware
Forward
Daniel Brière
Boyd Devereaux
Christian Dubé
Dwayne Hay
Brad Isbister
Brad Larsen
Trevor Letowski
Cameron Mann
Alyn McCauley
Peter Schaefer
Joe Thornton
Trent Whitfield
Shane Willis

1996 World Junior Ice Hockey Championship

Head coach: Marcel Comeau
Goaltender
Marc Denis
José Théodore
Defence
Chad Allan
Nolan Baumgartner
Denis Gauthier
Jason Holland
Chris Phillips
Wade Redden
Rhett Warrener
Forward
Jason Botterill
Curtis Brown
Hnat Domenichelli
Christian Dubé
Robb Gordon
Jarome Iginla
Daymond Langkow
Brad Larsen
Alyn McCauley
Craig Mills
Jason Podollan
Mike Watt
Jamie Wright

1995 World Junior Ice Hockey Championship

Head coach: Don Hay
Goaltender
Dan Cloutier
Jamie Storr
Defence
Chad Allan
Nolan Baumgartner
Ed Jovanovski
Bryan McCabe
Wade Redden
Jamie Rivers
Lee Sorochan
Forward
Jason Allison
Jason Botterill
Larry Courville
Alexandre Daigle
Éric Dazé
Shean Donovan
Jeff Friesen
Todd Harvey
Marty Murray
Jeff O'Neill
Denis Pederson
Ryan Smyth
Darcy Tucker

1994 World Junior Ice Hockey Championship

Head coach: Jos Canale
Goaltender
Manny Fernandez
Jamie Storr
Defence
Chris Armstrong
Drew Bannister
Joel Bouchard
Bryan McCabe
Nick Stajduhar
Brent Tully
Brendan Witt
Forward
Jason Allison
Jason Botterill
Curtis Bowen
Anson Carter
Brandon Convery
Yannick Dubé
Jeff Friesen
Aaron Gavey
Martin Gendron
Rick Girard
Todd Harvey
Marty Murray
Michael Peca

1993 World Junior Ice Hockey Championship

Head coach: Perry Pearn
Assistant coaches: Jos Canale, Dave Siciliano
Goaltender
Philippe DeRouville
Manny Legace
Defence
Adrian Aucoin
Joel Bouchard
Chris Pronger
Mike Rathje
Jason Smith
Brent Tully
Darcy Werenka
Forward
Jeff Bes
Alexandre Daigle
Jason Dawe
Martin Gendron
Chris Gratton
Ralph Intranuovo
Paul Kariya
Nathan LaFayette
Martin Lapointe
Dean McAmmond
Rob Niedermayer
Jeff Shantz
Tyler Wright

1992 World Junior Ice Hockey Championship

Head coach: Rick Cornacchia
Goaltender
Mike Fountain
Trevor Kidd
Defence
Brad Bombardir
Jassen Cullimore
Karl Dykhuis
Richard Matvichuk
Scott Niedermayer
John Slaney
Darryl Sydor
Forward
Kimbi Daniels
Ryan Hughes
Steve Junker
Paul Kariya
Martin Lapointe
Eric Lindros
Jeff Nelson
Chad Penney
Patrick Poulin
Andy Schneider
Turner Stevenson
David St. Pierre
Tyler Wright

1991 World Junior Ice Hockey Championship
Head coach: Dick Todd
Goaltender
Trevor Kidd
Félix Potvin
Defence
Patrice Brisebois
Karl Dykhuis
David Harlock
Jason Marshall
Scott Niedermayer
John Slaney
Chris Snell
Forward
Mike Craig
Dale Craigwell
Kris Draper
Pat Falloon
Greg Johnson
Martin Lapointe
Eric Lindros
Kent Manderville
Brad May
Steven Rice
Pierre Sévigny
Mike Sillinger
Scott Thornton

1990 World Junior Ice Hockey Championship

Head coach: Guy Charron
Goaltender
Stéphane Fiset
Trevor Kidd
Defence
Patrice Brisebois
Kevin Haller
Jason Herter
Stewart Malgunas
Adrien Plavsic
Dan Ratushny
Forward
Stu Barnes
Dave Chyzowski
Mike Craig
Kris Draper
Eric Lindros
Kent Manderville
Mike Needham
Dwayne Norris
Scott Pellerin
Mike Ricci
Steven Rice
Wes Walz

1989 World Junior Ice Hockey Championship
Head coach: Tom Webster
Rod Brind'Amour
Andrew Cassels
Rob Cimetta
Éric Desjardins
Stéphane Fiset
Corey Foster
Martin Gélinas
Sheldon Kennedy
Dan Lambert
Jamie Leach
Darcy Loewen
John McIntyre
Gus Morschauser
Rob Murphy
Yves Racine
Mike Ricci
Reggie Savage
Darrin Shannon
Geoff Smith
Steve Veilleux

1988 World Junior Ice Hockey Championship
Head coach: Dave Chambers
Warren Babe
Rob Brown
Dan Currie
Éric Desjardins
Rob DiMaio
Theoren Fleury (C)
Adam Graves
Jeff Hackett
Greg Hawgood
Jody Hull
Chris Joseph
Sheldon Kennedy
Marc Laniel
Trevor Linden
Wayne McBean
Scott McCrady
Mark Pederson
Mark Recchi
Joe Sakic
Jimmy Waite

1987 World Junior Ice Hockey Championship
Head coach: Bert Templeton
Steve Chiasson (C)
Yvon Corriveau
Pat Elynuik
Theoren Fleury
Greg Hawgood
Kerry Huffman
Chris Joseph
Mike Keane
David Latta
Dave McLlwain
Scott Metcalfe
Steve Nemeth
Luke Richardson
Stéphane Roy
Everett Sanipass
Brendan Shanahan
Shawn Simpson
Pierre Turgeon
Jimmy Waite
Glen Wesley

1986 World Junior Ice Hockey Championship
Head coach: Terry Simpson
Craig Billington
Sean Burke
Terry Carkner
Al Conroy
Shayne Corson
Alain Côté
Sylvain Côté
Peter Douris
Jeff Greenlaw
Derek Laxdal
Scott Mellanby
Dave Moylan
Joe Murphy
Joe Nieuwendyk
Selmar Odelein
Gary Roberts
Luc Robitaille
Jim Sandlak (C)
Mike Stapleton
Emanuel Viveiros

1985 World Junior Ice Hockey Championship
Head coach: Terry Simpson
Bob Bassen
Yves Beaudoin
Brad Berry
Jeff Beukeboom
Craig Billington
Brian Bradley
Wendel Clark
Shayne Corson
Adam Creighton
Bobby Dollas
Norm Foster
Dan Gratton
Dan Hodgson
Jeff Jackson
Greg Johnston
Claude Lemieux
John Miner
Selmar Odelein
Stéphane Richer
Jim Sandlak

1984 World Junior Ice Hockey Championship
Head coach: Brian Kilrea
Allan Bester
Lyndon Byers
Bruce Cassidy
Sylvain Côté
Yves Courteau
Russ Courtnall
J. J. Daigneault
Dale Derkatch
Gerald Diduck
Dean Evason
Dave Gagner
Randy Heath
Dan Hodgson
Gary Lacey
Gary Leeman
John MacLean
Kirk Muller
Mark Paterson
Brad Shaw
Ken Wregget

1983 World Junior Ice Hockey Championship
Head coach: Dave King
Dave Andreychuk
Paul Boutilier
Joe Cirella
Paul Cyr
Dale Derkatch
Mike Eagles
Patrick Flatley
Gary Leeman
Mario Lemieux
Mark Morrison
James Patrick
Mike Sands
Brad Shaw
Gord Sherven
Tony Tanti
Larry Trader
Sylvain Turgeon
Pat Verbeek
Mike Vernon
Steve Yzerman

1982 World Junior Ice Hockey Championship
Head coach: Dave King
Scott Arniel
Paul Boutilier
Garth Butcher
Frank Caprice
Paul Cyr
Bruce Eakin
Marc Habscheid
Gord Kluzak
Moe Lemay
Mike Moffat
Mike Moller
Randy Moller
Dave Morrison
Mark Morrison
Troy Murray
Gary Nylund
James Patrick
Pierre Rioux
Todd Strueby
Carey Wilson

1981 World Junior Ice Hockey Championship
Cornwall Royals*

Head coach: Bob Kilger
Scott Arniel
Fred Arthur
Fred Boimistruck
Eric Calder
Bill Campbell
André Chartrain
Marc Crawford
Denis Cyr
Gilbert Delorme
Jeff Eatough
Guy Fournier
Jean–Marc Gaulin
Doug Gilmour
Tom Graovac
Craig Halliday
Dale Hawerchuk
John Kirk
Corrado Micalef
Roy Russell
Robert Savard

1980 World Junior Ice Hockey Championship
Peterborough Petes*

Head coach: Mike Keenan
Dave Beckon
Terry Bovair
Dino Ciccarelli
Carmine Cirella
Doug Crossman
Dave Fenyves
Jim Fox
Bill Gardner
Andre Hidi
Yvon Joly
Bill Kitchen
Rick Lanz
Rick LaFerriere
Larry Murphy
Mark Reeds
Brad Ryder
Sean Simpson
Stuart Smith
Jim Wiemer
Terry Wright

1979 World Junior Ice Hockey Championship
New Westminster Bruins*

Head coach: Punch McLean
Keith Brown
Boris Fistric
Bill Hobbins
Bruce Howes
Yvan Joly
John–Paul Kelly
Terry Kirkham
Gary Lupul
Randy Irving
Scott MacLeod
Brad McCrimmon
Rollie Melanson
Larry Melnyk
John Ogrodnick
Dave Orleski
Brian Propp
Errol Rausse
Kent Reardon
Tom Semenchuk

1978 World Junior Ice Hockey Championship
Head coach: Punch McLean
Wayne Babych
Tim Bernhardt
Pat Daley
Curt Fraser
Mike Gartner
Wayne Gretzky
Craig Hartsburg
Willie Huber
Al Jensen
Brad Marsh
Brad McCrimmon
Tony McKegney
Rick Paterson
Rob Ramage
Bobby Smith
Stan Smyl
Steve Tambellini
Rick Vaive
Ryan Walter
Brian Young

1977 World Junior Ice Hockey Championship
St. Catharines Fincups*

Head coach: Bert Templeton
John Anderson
Joe Contini
Bob Daly
Ron Duguay
Mike Forbes
Steve Hazlett
Dwight Foster
Dennis Houle
Willie Huber
Dave Hunter
Al Jensen
Trevor Johansen
Mike Keating
Brad Marsh
Dale McCourt
Mark Plantery
Rob Ramage
Al Secord
Ric Seiling
Geoff Shaw

1976 World Junior Ice Hockey Championship
Sherbrooke Beavers

Head coach: Ghislain Delage
Alain Belanger
Joe Carlevale
Ron Carter
Dan Chicoine
Mario Claude
Robert Desormeaux
Jere Gillis
Mark Green
Denis Halle
Bernie Harbec
Ken Johnston
Floyd Lahache
Fern LeBlanc
Normand Lefebvre
Brendan Lowe
Peter Marsh
Benoît Perreault
Richard Sevigny
Robert Simpson
Regis Vallieres

1975 World Junior Ice Hockey Championship
WCHL All–Stars

Head coach: Jackie McLeod
Danny Arndt
Rick Blight
Mel Bridgman
Blair Davidson
Mark Davidson
Rob Flockhart
Kelly Greenbank
Larry Hendrick
Rick Hodgson
Ralph Klassen
Rick Lapointe
Bryan Maxwell
Kevin McCarthy
Terry McDonald
Dale McMullin
Jim Minor
Clayton Pachal
Robin Sadler
Barry Smith
Doug Soetaert
Ed Staniowski
Brian Sutter
Bryan Trottier
Greg Vaydik

1974 World Junior Ice Hockey Championship
Peterborough Petes

Head coach: Roger Neilson
John Ayotte
Tony Cassolato
Gord Duncan
Paul Evans
Bill Evo
Mike Fryia
Tom Gastle
Doug Halward
Doug Jarvis
Stan Jonathan
Mike Kasmetis
Don Laurence
Paul McIntosh
Brad Pirie
Ed Pizunski
Frank Salive
Peter Scamurra
Ed Smith
Jim Turkiewicz
Bobby Wasson

(*) denotes: Clubs that represented Canada between 1977 and 1981 (excluding 1978) were allowed to augment their roster with 7 skaters and 1 goalie of Canadian birth from any club.

See also

 Ice hockey at the 2006 Winter Olympics
 Ice hockey at the 2006 Winter Olympics match stats (women)
 Ice hockey
 Ice hockey statistics

References
 Hockey Canada roster accessed April 24, 2006.
 Torino Olympic Stats accessed April 24, 2006.
 Hockey Canada roster accessed April 23, 2006.

Canada
 
Rosters